

3001–3100 

|-
| 3001 Michelangelo ||  || Michelangelo (1475–1564), Italian sculptor, painter, architect, and poet of the High Renaissance || 
|-id=002
| 3002 Delasalle ||  || Jean-Baptiste de La Salle (1651–1719), French priest, educational reformer, and founder of the Institute of the Brothers of the Christian Schools || 
|-id=003
| 3003 Konček || 1983 YH || Mikuláš Konček (1900–1982), Slovak meteorologist who founded of the Meteorological Institute in Bratislava || 
|-id=004
| 3004 Knud || 1976 DD || Knud Rasmussen (1879–1933), Greenlandic/Danish polar explorer and anthropologist, who has been called the "father of Eskimology" || 
|-id=005
| 3005 Pervictoralex ||  || Per Victor Alexander Lagerkvist, son of Swedish discoverer Claes-Ingvar Lagerkvist || 
|-id=006
| 3006 Livadia ||  || Livadiya, a suburb of Yalta on the coast of the Crimean Peninsula || 
|-id=007
| 3007 Reaves || 1979 UC || Gibson Reaves, American astronomer, historian and educator at the University of Southern California || 
|-id=008
| 3008 Nojiri || 1938 WA || Hōei Nojiri (1885–1977) Japanese essayist, author and astronomer || 
|-id=009
| 3009 Coventry ||  || Coventry, England, sister city of Volgograd || 
|-id=010
| 3010 Ushakov ||  || Fyodor Ushakov (1745–1817), Russian admiral || 
|-id=011
| 3011 Chongqing ||  || Chongqing, China || 
|-id=012
| 3012 Minsk ||  || Minsk, Byelorussian SSR || 
|-id=013
| 3013 Dobrovoleva ||  || Oleg Vasilyevich Dobrovolsky, Soviet astronomer known for his cometary studies. He was the head of the Cometary Astronomy Department of the Institute of Astrophysics of the Tadjik S.S.R. Academy of Sciences in Dushanbe. || 
|-id=014
| 3014 Huangsushu || 1979 TM || Su-Shu Huang (1915–1977), Chinese-American astrophysicist known for his studies on circumstellar habitable zones and prerequisites of extraterrestrial life || 
|-id=015
| 3015 Candy || 1980 VN || Michael P. Candy (1928–1994), British astrometrist and discoverer of minor planets and comets. Director of the Royal Greenwich Observatory and Perth Observatory. President of IAU Commission VI. || 
|-id=016
| 3016 Meuse || 1981 EK || The Meuse River (Dutch Maas), which rises in France and flows through Belgium and the Netherlands || 
|-id=017
| 3017 Petrovič || 1981 UL || Štefan Petrovič (1906–?), Slovak climatologist || 
|-id=018
| 3018 Godiva || 1982 KM || Lady Godiva (died ca. 1076), medieval Anglo-Saxon noblewoman and church patron, wife of Leofric, Earl of Mercia || 
|-id=019
| 3019 Kulin || 1940 AC || György Kulin (1905–1989), Hungarian astronomer || 
|-id=020
| 3020 Naudts || 1949 PR || Ignace Naudts (1949–1992), Belgian amateur astronomer || 
|-id=021
| 3021 Lucubratio || 1967 CB || Latin for "nocturnal study, night work" (from lucubrum, candle) || 
|-id=022
| 3022 Dobermann || 1980 SH || Karl Friedrich Louis Dobermann (1834–1894), German zoologist and amateur astronomer known for breeding the Dobermann || 
|-id=023
| 3023 Heard || 1981 JS || John Frederick Heard (1907–1976), Canadian astronomer, professor of astronomy at the University of Toronto and fourth director of the David Dunlap Observatory || 
|-id=024
| 3024 Hainan ||  || Hainan Province || 
|-id=025
| 3025 Higson || 1982 QR || Roger Higson, American night assistant for the 1.2-meter Samuel Oschin telescope at Palomar Observatory in California. His supportive work has been appreciated by observers of comets and minor planets. || 
|-id=026
| 3026 Sarastro ||  || Sarastro, high priest of the Temple of Wisdom in Mozart's The Magic Flute || 
|-id=027
| 3027 Shavarsh ||  || Shavarsh Karapetyan (born 1953), Soviet–Armenian champion and world-record finswimmer, who saved 20 lives from drowning when a trolleybus fell into the Yerevan Lake. || 
|-id=028
| 3028 Zhangguoxi ||  || Zhang Guoxi, Chinese industrialist and philanthropist || 
|-id=029
| 3029 Sanders ||  || Jeffrey D. Sanders, American astronomer who participated in the Palomar Planet-Crossing Asteroid Survey as an undergraduate student || 
|-id=030
| 3030 Vehrenberg ||  || Hans Vehrenberg, German amateur astronomer from Düsseldorf. He is the author of the Atlas of Deep-Sky Splendors. For researchers on minor planets and comets, he published the "Falkauer Atlas" and "Atlas Stellarum". || 
|-id=031
| 3031 Houston || 1984 CX || Walter Scott Houston (1912–1993), American amateur astronomer well known for his column Deep Sky Wonders in Sky & Telescope || 
|-id=032
| 3032 Evans ||  || Reverend Robert O. Evans, Australian amateur astronomer, discoverer of several extragalactic supernovae || 
|-id=033
| 3033 Holbaek || 1984 EJ || Holbæk, Denmark, town nearest to the discovery site (Brorfelde Observatoriet) on the occasion of the former's 700th anniversary in 1986 || 
|-id=034
| 3034 Climenhaga || A917 SE || John L. Climenhaga (1916–2008), Canadian astronomer and father of journalist David Climenhaga (Src/Src) || 
|-id=035
| 3035 Chambers || A924 EJ || John Eric Chambers (born 1969), then British predoctoral fellow at the Harvard-Smithsonian Center for Astrophysics || 
|-id=036
| 3036 Krat || 1937 TO || Vladimir Krat (1911–1983), Russian astronomer || 
|-id=037
| 3037 Alku || 1944 BA || Finnish for "Beginning", the discoverer's boyhood boat, built by his father || 
|-id=038
| 3038 Bernes ||  || Mark Bernes (1911–1969), Soviet film actor and singer || 
|-id=039
| 3039 Yangel ||  || Mikhail Yangel (1911–1971), leading Soviet rocket and missile designer || 
|-id=040
| 3040 Kozai || 1979 BA || Yoshihide Kozai (1928–2018), Japanese astronomer and celestial mechanician, discoverer of the Kozai mechanism || 
|-id=041
| 3041 Webb || 1980 GD || Rev. Thomas William Webb (1807–1885), British astronomer, author of Celestial Objects for Common Telescopes and discoverer of S Orionis || 
|-id=042
| 3042 Zelinsky ||  || David S. Zelinsky, American mathematician at Brown University, formerly active participant in the Palomar Planet-Crossing Asteroid Survey while an undergraduate student at Caltech || 
|-id=043
| 3043 San Diego || 1982 SA || San Diego, California, in recognition of its efforts to curb light pollution || 
|-id=044
| 3044 Saltykov ||  || Nikita Saltykov (1893–1946), Russian farmer and grandfather of Natal'ja Vital'evna Metlova who co-discovered this minor planet || 
|-id=045
| 3045 Alois || 1984 AW || Alois T. Stuczynski, grandfather of American astronomer Joe Wagner who discovered this minor planet || 
|-id=046
| 3046 Molière || 4120 P-L || Molière (1622–1673), French playwright || 
|-id=047
| 3047 Goethe || 6091 P-L || Johann Wolfgang von Goethe (1749–1832), German poet and playwright || 
|-id=048
| 3048 Guangzhou ||  || Guangzhou, Guangdong, China || 
|-id=049
| 3049 Kuzbass || 1968 FH || The coal mining Kuznets Basin, located in the Kemerovo Region of Siberia, one of the richest coal deposits in the world || 
|-id=050
| 3050 Carrera || 1972 NW || The four brothers of the Carrera family: Javiera (1781–1862), Juan José (1782–1818), José Miguel (1785–1821), and Luis (1791–1818), key figures of the Chilean War of Independence || 
|-id=051
| 3051 Nantong || 1974 YP || Nantong, Jiangsu, China || 
|-id=052
| 3052 Herzen ||  || Alexander Herzen (1812–1870), Russian revolutionary, writer, and philosopher, "father of Russian socialism" and founder of the free Russian press abroad || 
|-id=053
| 3053 Dresden || 1977 QS || The German city of Dresden || 
|-id=054
| 3054 Strugatskia ||  || The brothers Arkady and Boris Strugatsky (1925–1991, 1933–2012) Russian science fiction writers || 
|-id=055
| 3055 Annapavlova ||  || Anna Pavlova (1881–1931), Russian prima ballerina best known for her performance of The Dying Swan || 
|-id=056
| 3056 INAG ||  || The French National Institute of Astronomy and Geophysics (INAG), which built the discovery telescope || 
|-id=057
| 3057 Mälaren || 1981 EG || Lake Mälaren, Sweden || 
|-id=058
| 3058 Delmary ||  || Delmary Rose Schanz (born 1938), American artist || 
|-id=059
| 3059 Pryor ||  || Carlton P. Pryor, American astronomer who participated in the Palomar Planet-Crossing Asteroid Survey while an undergraduate student at Caltech || 
|-id=060
| 3060 Delcano ||  || Juan Sebastián Elcano or del Caño (1476–1526), Spanish navigator, lieutenant of Magellan, first to continuously circumnavigate the globe || 
|-id=061
| 3061 Cook ||  || James Cook (1728–1779), British explorer and navigator || 
|-id=062
| 3062 Wren || 1982 XC || Sir Christopher Wren (1632–1723), British architect and astronomer || 
|-id=063
| 3063 Makhaon || 1983 PV || Makhaon, mythical physician to Greeks during the Trojan War || 
|-id=064
| 3064 Zimmer ||  || Louis Zimmer (1888–1970), Belgian amateur astronomer and clockmaker to the King of Belgium || 
|-id=065
| 3065 Sarahill || 1984 CV || Sarah J. Hill, professor of astronomy and chairman of the astronomy department at Wellesley College || 
|-id=066
| 3066 McFadden || 1984 EO || Lucy-Ann McFadden (born 1953), American astronomer and planetary scientist || 
|-id=067
| 3067 Akhmatova ||  || Anna Akhmatova (1889–1966), Soviet poet || 
|-id=068
| 3068 Khanina ||  || Frida Borisovna Khanina, Soviet orbit computer and long-time member of the Institute for Theoretical Astronomy || 
|-id=069
| 3069 Heyrovský ||  || Jaroslav Heyrovský (1890–1967), Czech physical chemist || 
|-id=070
| 3070 Aitken || 1949 GK || Robert Grant Aitken (1864–1951), American astronomer, fourth director of the Lick Observatory, and author of the "New General Catalogue of Double Stars within 12° of the North Pole" (1932) || 
|-id=071
| 3071 Nesterov ||  || Pyotr Nesterov (1887–1914), Russian pioneer airman || 
|-id=072
| 3072 Vilnius ||  || Vilnius, Lithuania || 
|-id=073
| 3073 Kursk ||  || Kursk, Russia || 
|-id=074
| 3074 Popov ||  || Alexander Stepanovich Popov (1859–1906), Russian radio inventor || 
|-id=075
| 3075 Bornmann ||  || Patricia L. Bornmann, American solar astronomer who participated in the Palomar Planet-Crossing Asteroid Survey while an undergraduate student at Caltech || 
|-id=076
| 3076 Garber ||  || Paul E. Garber (1899–1992), American historian and first head of the National Air Museum of the Smithsonian Institution, in Washington, D.C || 
|-id=077
| 3077 Henderson || 1982 SK || Thomas Henderson (1798–1844), Scottish astronomer, mathematician, and first Astronomer Royal for Scotland. In 1839 he was the first person to measure the distance Alpha Centauri || 
|-id=078
| 3078 Horrocks || 1984 FG || Jeremiah Horrocks (1619–1641), also known as Jeremiah Horrox, English astronomer and mathematician who predicted and was the first to observe the transit of Venus in 1639. He also demonstrated that the Moon moved around the Earth in an elliptical orbit. || 
|-id=079
| 3079 Schiller || 2578 P-L || Friedrich Schiller (1759–1805), German playwright || 
|-id=080
| 3080 Moisseiev || 1935 TE || Nikolay Moiseyev (1902–1955), Soviet astronomer and an expert in celestial mechanics || 
|-id=081
| 3081 Martinůboh || 1971 UP || Bohuslav Martinů (1890–1959), Czech composer of modern classical music || 
|-id=082
| 3082 Dzhalil || 1972 KE || Musa Cälil (Musa Mustafovich Dzhalil'; 1906–1944), Tatar Soviet poet and resistance fighter || 
|-id=083
| 3083 OAFA || 1974 MH || Félix Aguilar Observatory in Argentina || 
|-id=084
| 3084 Kondratyuk ||  || Yuri Kondratyuk (1897–1942), Soviet engineer, mathematician and pioneer of astronautics and spaceflight || 
|-id=085
| 3085 Donna || 1980 DA || Donna Marie Thompson, American administrative assistant for the Minor Planet Center and the Central Bureau for Astronomical Telegrams, secretary for the Planetary Sciences division of the Harvard-Smithsonian Center for Astrophysics || 
|-id=086
| 3086 Kalbaugh || 1980 XE || Carroll Kalbaugh Liller, father of Chilean astronomer William Liller || 
|-id=087
| 3087 Beatrice Tinsley ||  || Beatrice Tinsley (1941–1981), British-born New Zealand astronomer and cosmologist || 
|-id=088
| 3088 Jinxiuzhonghua ||  || "Splendid China", park at Shenzhen, the largest miniature scenic spot in the world || 
|-id=089
| 3089 Oujianquan ||  || Ou Jianquan, Chinese entrepreneur, for his notable contributions developing township enterprises || 
|-id=090
| 3090 Tjossem || 1982 AN || The Tjossem family of central Washington State, four generations of whose members have been friends of the discoverer and his family (in particular Peter Tjossem, 19th–20th-century amateur entomologist and paleobotanist) || 
|-id=091
| 3091 van den Heuvel || 6081 P-L || Ed van den Heuvel (born 1940), Dutch astronomer, and his niece Julia Edith van den Heuvel || 
|-id=092
| 3092 Herodotus || 6550 P-L || Herodotus (c. 484 BC – c. 425 BC), Greek historian, "Father of Historiography" || 
|-id=093
| 3093 Bergholz || 1971 MG || Olga Bergholz (1910–1975), Soviet poet || 
|-id=094
| 3094 Chukokkala ||  || Korney Chukovsky (1882–1969), pen name of Nikolaj Kornejchukov, one of the most popular children's poets in the Russian language || 
|-id=095
| 3095 Omarkhayyam ||  || Omar Khayyam (1048–1131), Persian astronomer, mathematician and philosopher || 
|-id=096
| 3096 Bezruč ||  || Petr Bezruč (1867–1958), Czech poet || 
|-id=097
| 3097 Tacitus || 2011 P-L || Tacitus (c. 56–120), Roman historian || 
|-id=098
| 3098 van Sprang || 4579 P-L || Bert van Sprang (1944–2015), Dutch meteor specialist || 
|-id=099
| 3099 Hergenrother || 1940 GF || Carl W. Hergenrother (born 1973), American astronomer and discoverer of minor planets || 
|-id=100
| 3100 Zimmerman ||  || Nikolaj Vladimirovich Zimmerman (1890–1942), Russian astronomer at Pulkovo Observatory and professor at Leningrad University, known for his astrometric observations and his compilations of star catalogs || 
|}

3101–3200 

|-
| 3101 Goldberger || 1978 GB || Marvin Leonard Goldberger (1922–2014), American physicist, teacher and humanitarian, president of the California Institute of Technology, to commemorate his birthday, October 22 || 
|-id=102
| 3102 Krok || 1981 QA || Krok (Libuše), mythical Slavonic prince || 
|-id=103
| 3103 Eger || 1982 BB || Eger a small town NE of Budapest, at one time the sixth largest town in Hungary, known for its medieval streets, castle, and red wine (Bull's Blood) || 
|-id=104
| 3104 Dürer ||  || Albrecht Dürer (1471–1528), German master painter, woodcutter, engraver, and scholar || 
|-id=105
| 3105 Stumpff || A907 PB || Karl Stumpff (1895–1970), German celestial mechanician and professor of astronomy, pioneer of Fast Fourier Analysis, author of the three-volume Himmelsmechanik || 
|-id=106
| 3106 Morabito || 1981 EE || Linda A. Morabito (born 1953), Education Programs Manager at the Planetary Society || 
|-id=107
| 3107 Weaver ||  || Kenneth Weaver (1915–2010), American senior assistant editor for science of the National Geographic magazine || 
|-id=108
| 3108 Lyubov || 1972 QM || Lyubov Orlova (1902–1975), actress and star of Soviet cinema || 
|-id=109
| 3109 Machin || 1974 DC || Arnold Machin (1911–1999), British sculptor || 
|-id=110
| 3110 Wagman || 1975 SC || Nicholas E. Wagman (1905–1980), American astronomer and astrometrist || 
|-id=111
| 3111 Misuzu ||  || Nickname of Shinano Province, now Nagano Prefecture, Japan, the discovery site || 
|-id=112
| 3112 Velimir ||  || Velimir (Viktor Vladimirovitch) Khlebnikov, 19th–20th-century Russian poet || 
|-id=113
| 3113 Chizhevskij || 1978 RO || Aleksandr Leonidovich Chizhevskij, 20th-century Soviet biologist, one of the founders of heliobiology || 
|-id=114
| 3114 Ercilla ||  || Don Alonso de Ercilla y Zúñiga, 16th-century Spanish poet and soldier, who distinguished himself in the campaign in Chile against the Araucanians, inspiration for the epic poem La Araucana || 
|-id=115
| 3115 Baily || 1981 PL || Francis Baily, 18th–19th-century English astronomer, one of the founders of the Royal Astronomical Society, and namesake of Baily's beads || 
|-id=116
| 3116 Goodricke || 1983 CF || John Goodricke, 18th-century Dutch-English deaf-mute astronomer, who identified Algol as an eclipsing variable and discovered δ Cephei || 
|-id=117
| 3117 Niepce ||  || Joseph Nicéphore Niépce, 18th–19th-century French photography pioneer || 
|-id=118
| 3118 Claytonsmith || 1974 OD || Clayton Albert Smith (1934–1993), American astrometrist, director of the Yale-Columbia Southern Observatory and later the United States Naval Observatory's astrometry department || 
|-id=119
| 3119 Dobronravin || 1972 YX || Petr Pavlovich Dobronravin, Russian astrophysicist and spectroscopist, deputy director of the Crimean Astrophysical Observatory 1952–1969 || 
|-id=120
| 3120 Dangrania || 1979 RZ || Daniil Aleksandrovich Granin, 20th-century Russian writer || 
|-id=121
| 3121 Tamines || 1981 EV || Tamines, Belgium, now called (Sambreville) || 
|-id=122
| 3122 Florence ||  || Florence Nightingale, English nurse and hospital reformer || 
|-id=123
| 3123 Dunham ||  || David W. Dunham, American astronomer, organizer of the International Occultation Timing Association || 
|-id=124
| 3124 Kansas || 1981 VB || Kansas, United States, the discoverer's home state, and also the University of Kansas, the discoverer's alma mater, to commemorate the centennial of observational astronomy there, which began with the purchase of an Alvan Clark 6-inch refractor in 1885 || 
|-id=125
| 3125 Hay ||  || William Thompson Hay (1888–1949), British music-hall comedian, film star of the 1930s and early 1940s, and amateur astronomer, (re)discoverer of Saturn's Great White Spot in 1933 || 
|-id=126
| 3126 Davydov ||  || Denis Vasil'evich Davydov (1784–1839), Russian officer, writer and poet, hero of the Patriotic War of 1812 || 
|-id=127
| 3127 Bagration ||  || Petr Ivanovich Bagration, 18th–19th-century Russian (of Georgian descent) general, hero of the Patriotic War of 1812 who died at the Battle of Borodino || 
|-id=128
| 3128 Obruchev ||  || Vladimir Afanasjevich Obruchev, 19th–20th-century Russian geologist, geographer, and author of popular books on science and science-fiction novels || 
|-id=129
| 3129 Bonestell ||  || Chesley Bonestell, American space artist. Named following a competition organized by the Planetary Society || 
|-id=130
| 3130 Hillary || 1981 YO || Sir Edmund Hillary, British mountaineer || 
|-id=131
| 3131 Mason-Dixon ||  || Charles Mason and Jeremiah Dixon, 18th-century British astronomers who observed the 1761 transit of Venus from the Cape of Good Hope, and later (1763–1767) surveyed the boundary between Pennsylvania and Maryland, the Mason–Dixon line || 
|-id=132
| 3132 Landgraf || 1940 WL || Werner Landgraf, German astronomer, who established the orbit (and whose initials appear in the provisional designation) || 
|-id=133
| 3133 Sendai || A907 TC || Sendai, Japan, the "Heidelberg of the East" (this object was discovered from Heidelberg) and the Sendai Municipal Astronomical Observatory || 
|-id=134
| 3134 Kostinsky || A921 VA || Sergej Konstantinovich Kostinsky (1867–1936), Russian astronomer, after whom the "Kostinsky effect" is named || 
|-id=135
| 3135 Lauer ||  || Tod R. Lauer, American astronomer, who participated in the Palomar Planet-Crossing Asteroid Survey while an undergraduate student at Caltech || 
|-id=136
| 3136 Anshan ||  || Anshan, Liaoning, China || 
|-id=137
| 3137 Horky ||  || Czech hill, site of Antonín Mrkos' first telescope || 
|-id=138
| 3138 Ciney || 1980 KL || Ciney, Belgium, chief town of the Condroz, where the discoverer maintains a residence || 
|-id=139
| 3139 Shantou ||  || Shantou, Guangdong, China || 
|-id=140
| 3140 Stellafane || 1983 AO || Stellafane, the annual Vermont star party organized by the "Springfield Telescope Makers" || 
|-id=141
| 3141 Buchar || 1984 RH || Emil Buchar (1901–1979), Czech discoverer of minor planets and pioneer of satellite geodesy || 
|-id=142
| 3142 Kilopi || 1937 AC || Kilopi, or 1000 × π, which rounds off to 3142, the number assigned to this minor planet || 
|-id=143
| 3143 Genecampbell || 1980 UA || I. Gene Campbell, American systems programmer in the central computing facility at the Harvard-Smithsonian Center for Astrophysics || 
|-id=144
| 3144 Brosche ||  || Peter Brosche (born 1936), German astronomer || 
|-id=145
| 3145 Walter Adams || 1955 RY || Walter Sydney Adams, 19th–20th-century American astronomer, director of the Mount Wilson Observatory (1923–1946), whose spectroscopic studies led to the discovery, with Ernst Arnold Kohlschütter, of the spectroscopic method for determining parallax, and who identified Sirius B as the first white-dwarf star known || 
|-id=146
| 3146 Dato || 1972 KG || Dato Kratsashvili (1963–1980), young Georgian painter || 
|-id=147
| 3147 Samantha ||  || Samantha Reed Smith, 20th-century American schoolgirl who became "America's Youngest Ambassador" || 
|-id=148
| 3148 Grechko ||  || Georgii Mikhailovich Grechko, Soviet cosmonaut and scientist || 
|-id=149
| 3149 Okudzhava || 1981 SH || Bulat Okudzhava, Russian (of Georgian descent) writer, poet and songwriter || 
|-id=150
| 3150 Tosa || 1983 CB || Tosa Province (Ancient name of Kōchi Prefecture), Japan, the discoverer's place of residence || 
|-id=151
| 3151 Talbot || 1983 HF || Henry Fox Talbot (1800–1877), British inventor and pioneer of photography || 
|-id=152
| 3152 Jones || 1983 LF || Albert F. A. L. Jones (1920–2013), New Zealand amateur astronomer || 
|-id=153
| 3153 Lincoln ||  || Abraham Lincoln (1809–1865), 16th American President of the United States || 
|-id=154
| 3154 Grant ||  || Ulysses S. Grant (1822–1885), 18th American President of the United States || 
|-id=155
| 3155 Lee ||  || Robert E. Lee (1807–1870), American general and commander of the Confederate Army of Northern Virginia in the American Civil War || 
|-id=156
| 3156 Ellington || 1953 EE || Duke Ellington (1899–1974), American musician || 
|-id=157
| 3157 Novikov ||  || Alexei Ivanovich Novikov (1916–1986), Soviet aviator and poet || 
|-id=158
| 3158 Anga ||  || Siberian village, birthplace of Russian ethnographers Ivan Evseevich Venyaminov and Afanasij Prokopevich Shchapov || 
|-id=159
| 3159 Prokofʹev ||  || Vladimir Prokofiev (1898–1993), Russian spectroscopist || 
|-id=160
| 3160 Angerhofer || 1980 LE || Phillip Edward Angerhofer (1950–1986), American astronomer and astrophysicist at USNO || 
|-id=161
| 3161 Beadell ||  || Len Beadell (1923–1995), Australian surveyor || 
|-id=162
| 3162 Nostalgia || 1980 YH || Nostalgia, a sentimentality for the past || 
|-id=163
| 3163 Randi || 1981 QM || James Randi (1928–2020), Canadian-American magician and science skeptic, who debunked numerous paranormal and pseudoscientific claims || 
|-id=164
| 3164 Prast || 6562 P-L || Martin Prast, American citizen and war veteran || 
|-id=165
| 3165 Mikawa || 1984 QE || Mikawa Province (Ancient name of eastern half of Aichi Prefecture), Japan || 
|-id=166
| 3166 Klondike || 1940 FG || The brothers Karl F. Joutsen and Anton F. Johnson, who made a fortune in the Klondike Gold Rush || 
|-id=167
| 3167 Babcock || 1955 RS || Horace W. Babcock (1912–2003) and his father Harold D. Babcock (1882–1968), American astronomers || 
|-id=168
| 3168 Lomnický Štít || 1980 XM || Lomnický Štít, Czech meteorological and solar observatory || 
|-id=169
| 3169 Ostro || 1981 LA || Steven Jeffrey Ostro (1946–2008), American radar astronomer || 
|-id=170
| 3170 Dzhanibekov ||  || Vladimir Dzhanibekov (born 1942), Soviet cosmonaut || 
|-id=171
| 3171 Wangshouguan || 1979 WO || Shou-Guan Wang (Wang Shouguan), Chinese astronomer and honorary president of the Chinese Astronomical Society || 
|-id=172
| 3172 Hirst || 1981 WW || William Parkinson Hirst, South African astronomer and orbit computer || 
|-id=173
| 3173 McNaught || 1981 WY || Robert McNaught (born 1956), British astronomer and discoverer of minor planets || 
|-id=174
| 3174 Alcock || 1984 UV || George Alcock (1912–2000), British comet and nova hunter || 
|-id=175
| 3175 Netto || 1979 YP || Edgar Rangel Netto, Brazilian astronomer || 
|-id=176
| 3176 Paolicchi ||  || Paolo Paolicchi, Italian astrophysicist and professor at University of Pisa || 
|-id=177
| 3177 Chillicothe || 1934 AK || City of Chillicothe, Ohio || 
|-id=178
| 3178 Yoshitsune || 1984 WA || Minamoto no Yoshitsune (1159–1189), nobleman and military commander, and one of the best known samurais || 
|-id=179
| 3179 Beruti || 1962 FA || Arturo Berutti (1862–1938), Argentinian composer of classical music, known for his operas Pampa, Kryse, Evangelina and Taras Bulba || 
|-id=180
| 3180 Morgan || 1962 RO || William Wilson Morgan (1906–1994), American astronomer || 
|-id=181
| 3181 Ahnert || 1964 EC || Paul Oswald Ahnert (1897–1989), German astronomer and author of the annual Kalender fur Sternfreunde || 
|-id=182
| 3182 Shimanto || 1984 WC || Shimanto River, longest river of the discoverer's home prefecture of Kochi, Japan || 
|-id=183
| 3183 Franzkaiser || 1949 PP || Franz Kaiser (1891–1962), German astronomer || 
|-id=184
| 3184 Raab || 1949 QC || Herbert Raab (born 1969), Austrian software engineer and amateur astronomer, author of Astrometrica software || 
|-id=185
| 3185 Clintford ||  || Clinton B. Ford (1913–1992), American investor and amateur astronomer, secretary of the AAVSO, co-founder of the Ford Observatory, and recipient of ASP's Amateur Achievement Award || 
|-id=186
| 3186 Manuilova ||  || Olga Maksimilianovna Manuilova (1893–1984), Soviet sculptor || 
|-id=187
| 3187 Dalian ||  || Dalian, Liaoning, China || 
|-id=188
| 3188 Jekabsons || 1978 OM || Peter Jekabsons (1943–1990), Australian amateur astronomer and astronomical painter, whose paintings adorn the walls of the discovering Perth Observatory || 
|-id=189
| 3189 Penza ||  || Penza, Russian city || 
|-id=190
| 3190 Aposhanskij ||  || Vladimir Mikhailovich Aposhanskij (1910–1943), Soviet poet and journalist || 
|-id=191
| 3191 Svanetia ||  || Svanetia, a mountainous district in Georgia || 
|-id=192
| 3192 A'Hearn ||  || Michael A'Hearn (1940–2017), American astronomer || 
|-id=193
| 3193 Elliot || 1982 DJ || James L. Elliot (1943–2011), American professor of physics and astronomy at the Massachusetts Institute of Technology and co-discoverer of the Uranian rings || 
|-id=194
| 3194 Dorsey ||  || Dorsey Taylor Shoemaker Jr., American businessman and uncle of Eugene Shoemaker (formerly credited 2nd discoverer) || 
|-id=195
| 3195 Fedchenko ||  || The Russian Fedchenko family: Alexei Pavlovich Fedchenko (1844–1873), naturalist and explorer, his wife Olga Fedchenko (1845–1921), botanist and plant collector, and their son Boris Fedtschenko (1872–1947), botanist, geographer and writer. || 
|-id=196
| 3196 Maklaj || 1978 RY || Nicholas Miklouho-Maclay (1846–1888), Russian ethnologist and anthropologist who studied the Papuans in New Guinea || 
|-id=197
| 3197 Weissman || 1981 AD || Paul Robert Weissman, American cometary physicist || 
|-id=198
| 3198 Wallonia ||  || Wallonia (Walloon Region), one of the three federal regions of Belgium, the discoverer's birthplace and location of the Institut d'astrophysique (the discovery site operator) || 
|-id=199
| 3199 Nefertiti || 1982 RA || Nefertiti (c. 1370 – c. 1330 BC), Egyptian queen || 
|-id=200
| 3200 Phaethon || 1983 TB || Phaethon from Greek mythology. Son of Helios, he operated the solar chariot for a day, lost control of it and almost set fire to the Earth (the object, associated with the Geminid meteor stream, had then the smallest known perihelion distance) || 
|}

3201–3300 

|-
| 3201 Sijthoff || 6560 P-L || Albert Georg Sijthoff, Dutch publisher whose family backed the construction of the Sijthoff Planetarium in The Hague in 1934. || 
|-id=202
| 3202 Graff || A908 AA || Gareth V. Williams (born 1965), British astronomer at the Minor Planet Center || 
|-id=203
| 3203 Huth || 1938 SL || Hans Huth (1925–1988), German astronomer || 
|-id=204
| 3204 Lindgren || 1978 RH || Astrid Lindgren (1907–2002), Swedish writer || 
|-id=205
| 3205 Boksenberg ||  || Alexander Boksenberg (born 1936), British astronomer || 
|-id=206
| 3206 Wuhan ||  || Wuhan, the largest city in central China || 
|-id=207
| 3207 Spinrad ||  || Hyron Spinrad (1934–2015), American astronomer || 
|-id=208
| 3208 Lunn || 1981 JM || Borge Lunn, Danish civil engineer and metallurgist || 
|-id=209
| 3209 Buchwald ||  || Vagn Fabritius Buchwald, Danish meteoriticist || 
|-id=210
| 3210 Lupishko ||  || Dmitrij Fedorovich Lupishko, Ukrainian astronomer || 
|-id=211
| 3211 Louispharailda || 1931 CE || Louis Pierre Van Biesbroeck, and Pharailda de Colpaert Van Biesbroeck, parents of the discoverer || 
|-id=212
| 3212 Agricola ||  || Georgius Agricola (1494–1555), German scientist, "father of mineralogy" || 
|-id=213
| 3213 Smolensk || 1977 NQ || Smolensk, Russian city || 
|-id=214
| 3214 Makarenko ||  || Anton Makarenko (1888–1939), Soviet teacher and writer || 
|-id=215
| 3215 Lapko || 1980 BQ || Konstantin Kuz'mich Lapko, Soviet surgeon || 
|-id=216
| 3216 Harrington || 1980 RB || Robert Sutton Harrington (1942–1993), American astronomer || 
|-id=217
| 3217 Seidelmann || 1980 RK || Paul Kenneth Seidelmann, American astronomer || 
|-id=218
| 3218 Delphine || 6611 P-L || Delphine Jehoulet Delsemme, wife of Armand Delsemme, a Belgian-born astronomer at the University of Toledo in Ohio (see ) || 
|-id=219
| 3219 Komaki || 1934 CX || Kōjirō Komaki, Japanese amateur astronomer || 
|-id=220
| 3220 Murayama || 1951 WF || Sadao Murayama, Japanese astronomer || 
|-id=221
| 3221 Changshi ||  || Changshu, Jiangsu, China || 
|-id=222
| 3222 Liller || 1983 NJ || William Liller, American astronomer † || 
|-id=223
| 3223 Forsius || 1942 RN || Sigfrid Aronus Forsius (Siegfried Aronsen; c. 1550–1624), Finnish-born Professor of Astronomy in Uppsala, Sweden. His 1611 manuscript propounding his theory of colours was discovered in the Royal Library in Stockholm in 1969 || 
|-id=224
| 3224 Irkutsk ||  || Irkutsk, Russia || 
|-id=225
| 3225 Hoag || 1982 QQ || Arthur Hoag (1921–1999), American astronomer || 
|-id=226
| 3226 Plinius || 6565 P-L || Pliny the Younger (62–114) || 
|-id=227
| 3227 Hasegawa || 1928 DF || Ichirō Hasegawa, Japanese astronomer || 
|-id=228
| 3228 Pire || 1935 CL || Georges Pire (Father Dominique), Belgian monk (Dominican Order), winner of the 1958 Nobel Prize for Peace || 
|-id=229
| 3229 Solnhofen || A916 PC || Solnhofen, south (SSE) of Nuremberg in Germany and known for its limestone and fossils || 
|-id=230
| 3230 Vampilov || 1972 LE || Alexander Vampilov (1937–1972), Soviet playwright || 
|-id=231
| 3231 Mila ||  || Lyudmila Pakhomova (1946–1986), Soviet ice dancer || 
|-id=232
| 3232 Brest || 1974 SL || Brest, a city in Belarus || 
|-id=233
| 3233 Krišbarons ||  || Krišjānis Barons (1835–1923), Latvian folklorist || 
|-id=234
| 3234 Hergiani ||  || Mikhail Vissarionovich Hergiani (1932–1969), famous Soviet mountaineer || 
|-id=235
| 3235 Melchior ||  || Paul Jacques Léon Melchior, Belgian geophysicist || 
|-id=236
| 3236 Strand ||  || Kaj Aage Gunnar Strand (1907–2000), Danish and American astronomer || 
|-id=237
| 3237 Victorplatt ||  || Victor D. Platt, father of astronomer John Platt who discovered this minor planet || 
|-id=238
| 3238 Timresovia ||  || Nikolay Timofeev-Ressovsky (1900–1981), Soviet biologist || 
|-id=239
| 3239 Meizhou ||  || Meizhou, Guangdong, China || 
|-id=240
| 3240 Laocoon ||  || Laocoön, Trojan priest of Poseidon || 
|-id=241
| 3241 Yeshuhua ||  || Ye Shuhua (born 1927), Chinese astronomer || 
|-id=242
| 3242 Bakhchisaraj ||  || Bakhchisaray, a town in Crimea, the center of the same district where Crimean Astrophysical Observatory was created || 
|-id=243
| 3243 Skytel || 1980 DC || named after Sky and Telescope magazine for its 50th anniversary || 
|-id=244
| 3244 Petronius || 4008 P-L || Petronius (c. 27–66 AD), Roman writer || 
|-id=245
| 3245 Jensch ||  || Alfred Jensch, German astronomer || 
|-id=246
| 3246 Bidstrup ||  || Herluf Bidstrup (1912–1988), Danish caricaturist || 
|-id=247
| 3247 Di Martino || 1981 YE || Mario Di Martino (born 1947), Italian astronomer and discoverer of minor planets at the Turin Observatory. He has been a prolific photometrist of rotational light-curves of minor planets, specialized in determining their shape and pole. || 
|-id=248
| 3248 Farinella || 1982 FK || Paolo Farinella (1953–2000), Italian astronomer || 
|-id=249
| 3249 Musashino ||  || Musashino, a suburb of Tokyo, Japan || 
|-id=250
| 3250 Martebo || 1979 EB || Martebo, on Gotland island in Sweden || 
|-id=251
| 3251 Eratosthenes || 6536 P-L || Eratosthenes (c. 276–194 BC), Ancient Greek scientist || 
|-id=252
| 3252 Johnny ||  || Johnny Carson (1925–2005), American TV host and comedian, and amateur astronomer || 
|-id=253
| 3253 Gradie ||  || Jonathan Carey Gradie, American astronomer || 
|-id=254
| 3254 Bus || 1982 UM || Schelte J. Bus (born 1956), American astronomer and discoverer of minor planets || 
|-id=255
| 3255 Tholen || 1980 RA || David J. Tholen (born 1955), American astronomer and discoverer of minor planets || 
|-id=256
| 3256 Daguerre ||  || Louis Daguerre (1787–1851), French chemist and artist, pioneer of photography (the Daguerreotype process) || 
|-id=257
| 3257 Hanzlík || 1982 GG || Stanislav Hanzlík (1878–1956), Czech meteorologist and climatologist || 
|-id=258
| 3258 Somnium || 1983 RJ || Kepler's Somnium, sive opus posthumum de astronomia lunaris (The Dream, or Posthumous Work on Lunar Astronomy), which combined a serious study of lunar astronomy and the fictional account of a journey to the Moon || 
|-id=259
| 3259 Brownlee ||  || Donald E. Brownlee (born 1943), American astronomer || 
|-id=260
| 3260 Vizbor ||  || Yuri Vizbor (1934–1984), Russian actor, poet, writer, composer and playwright || 
|-id=261
| 3261 Tvardovskij ||  || Aleksandr Tvardovsky (1910–1971), Soviet poet || 
|-id=262
| 3262 Miune || 1983 WB || Miune, mountain in Kōchi, Japan || 
|-id=263
| 3263 Bligh || 1932 CN || William Bligh (1754–1817), captain of the Bounty || 
|-id=264
| 3264 Bounty || 1934 AF || , ship || 
|-id=265
| 3265 Fletcher ||  || Fletcher Christian (1764–1793), Bounty mutineer || 
|-id=266
| 3266 Bernardus || 1978 PA || Andres Bernardus Muller, Dutch astronomer || 
|-id=267
| 3267 Glo || 1981 AA || Eleanor F. Helin (1932–2009), American astronomer, comet hunter, discoverer of minor planets and advisor to the Planetary Society. Glo is her nickname. || 
|-id=268
| 3268 De Sanctis || 1981 DD || Giovanni de Sanctis (born 1949), Italian astronomer and a discoverer of minor planets || 
|-id=269
| 3269 Vibert-Douglas ||  || Vibert Douglas (1894–1988), Canadian astronomer || 
|-id=270
| 3270 Dudley || 1982 DA || H. Dudley Wright, engineer, inventor, entrepreneur and benefactor of science, education and the arts in California and in Geneva, Switzerland. || 
|-id=271
| 3271 Ul || 1982 RB || Ul, a lunar deity in the mythology of Vanuatu || 
|-id=272
| 3272 Tillandz ||  || Elias Tillandz (1640–1693), Swedish physician and botanist || 
|-id=273
| 3273 Drukar ||  || Ivan Fyodorov (1525–1583), one of the first printers of books in Russia and Ukraine. The word Drukar means ‘printer' in Ukrainian and old Russian. || 
|-id=274
| 3274 Maillen ||  || Maillen, Belgium || 
|-id=275
| 3275 Oberndorfer ||  || Hans Oberndorfer (1925–2006), German amateur astronomer, author and director of the Bavarian Public Observatory (Volkssternwarte München) || 
|-id=276
| 3276 Porta Coeli ||  || Porta Coeli ("Gateway to Heaven") convent in Tišnov, Czech Republic || 
|-id=277
| 3277 Aaronson ||  || Marc Aaronson (1950–1987), American astronomer || 
|-id=278
| 3278 Běhounek || 1984 BT || František Běhounek (1898–1973), Czech physicist || 
|-id=279
| 3279 Solon || 9103 P-L || Solon (c. 630–560 BC), Greek lawmaker || 
|-id=280
| 3280 Grétry || 1933 SJ || André Grétry (1741–1813), Belgian composer from Wallonia || 
|-id=281
| 3281 Maupertuis || 1938 DZ || Pierre Louis Maupertuis (1698–1759), French mathematician and astronomer || 
|-id=282
| 3282 Spencer Jones || 1949 DA || Harold Spencer Jones (1890–1960), British astronomer, former Astronomer Royal || 
|-id=283
| 3283 Skorina ||  || Francysk Skaryna (died 1552), first doctor of medicine in Belarus, printer and publisher || 
|-id=284
| 3284 Niebuhr || 1953 NB || Reinhold Niebuhr (1892–1971), American theologian || 
|-id=285
| 3285 Ruth Wolfe ||  || Ruth Fanton Wolfe, American geologist, colleague of Gene and Carolyn Shoemaker at the United States Geological Survey || 
|-id=286
| 3286 Anatoliya || 1980 BV || Anatoly V. Karachkin (1947–1984), brother-in-law of astronomer Lyudmila Karachkina who discovered this minor planet || 
|-id=287
| 3287 Olmstead ||  || C. Michelle Olmstead (born 1969), American astronomer and discoverer of minor planets || 
|-id=288
| 3288 Seleucus || 1982 DV || Seleucus I Nicator (c. 358–281 BC), one of the generals of Alexander the Great and heir to the largest part of his empire || 
|-id=289
| 3289 Mitani || 1934 RP || Tetsuyasu Mitani (1927–2004), Japanese astronomer and discoverer of 1619 Ueta || 
|-id=290
| 3290 Azabu ||  || Azabu, a district of Tokyo, Japan || 
|-id=291
| 3291 Dunlap ||  || Larry Dunlap, American astronomer || 
|-id=292
| 3292 Sather || 2631 P-L || Bob Sather, research assistant Lunar and Planetary Laboratory || 
|-id=293
| 3293 Rontaylor || 4650 P-L || Ronald C. Taylor, American astronomer || 
|-id=294
| 3294 Carlvesely || 6563 P-L || Carl D. Vesely, American astronomer || 
|-id=295
| 3295 Murakami || 1950 DH || Tadayoshi Murakami (1907–1985), Japanese astronomer || 
|-id=296
| 3296 Bosque Alegre || 1975 SF || The astrophysical station of Córdoba Observatory in Argentina || 
|-id=297
| 3297 Hong Kong ||  || Hong Kong, Chinese island and city || 
|-id=298
| 3298 Massandra ||  || Massandra, town on the Crimean peninsula || 
|-id=299
| 3299 Hall ||  || John Scoville Hall, American astronomer and director of the Lowell Observatory from 1958 to 1977 || 
|-id=300
| 3300 McGlasson || 1928 NA || Scottish Surname of a small clan located in the highlands of Scotland. || 
|}

3301–3400 

|-
| 3301 Jansje || 1978 CT || Jansje Verveer, mother of Dutch astronomer Arie Verveer || 
|-id=302
| 3302 Schliemann ||  || Heinrich Schliemann (1822–1890), German archaeologist || 
|-id=303
| 3303 Merta || 1967 UN || František Merta (1872–1953), teacher and journalist. Grandfather of the discoverer. || 
|-id=304
| 3304 Pearce ||  || Joseph Algernon Pearce (1893–1988), Canadian astronomer || 
|-id=305
| 3305 Ceadams || 1985 KB || Charles Edward Adams (1870–1945), New Zealand astronomer || 
|-id=306
| 3306 Byron ||  || Lord Byron (1788–1824), British poet || 
|-id=307
| 3307 Athabasca ||  || The Athabascans, ancient people of North America || 
|-id=308
| 3308 Ferreri || 1981 EP || Walter Ferreri (born 1948), Italian astronomer and discoverer of minor planets || 
|-id=309
| 3309 Brorfelde || 1982 BH || Brorfelde Observatory in Denmark || 
|-id=310
| 3310 Patsy ||  || Patricia Tombaugh (1912–2012), wife of discoverer Clyde Tombaugh || 
|-id=311
| 3311 Podobed ||  || Vladimir Vladimirovich Podobed, Soviet astronomer || 
|-id=312
| 3312 Pedersen || 1984 SN || Holger Pedersen (born 1946), Danish astronomer || 
|-id=313
| 3313 Mendel || 1980 DG || Gregor Mendel (1822–1884), Czech-Austrian father of genetics || 
|-id=314
| 3314 Beals || 1981 FH || Carlyle Smith Beals (1899–1979), Canadian astronomer || 
|-id=315
| 3315 Chant || 1984 CZ || Clarence Chant (1865–1956), Canadian astronomer || 
|-id=316
| 3316 Herzberg ||  || Gerhard Herzberg (1904–1999), German-born Canadian chemist and astronomer || 
|-id=317
| 3317 Paris || 1984 KF || Paris, Trojan prince || 
|-id=318
| 3318 Blixen || 1985 HB || Karen Blixen (1885–1962), Danish writer || 
|-id=319
| 3319 Kibi ||  || Kibi Province (ancient name of Okayama Prefecture and eastern half of Hiroshima Prefecture), Japan || 
|-id=320
| 3320 Namba ||  || Naniwa, traditional name of Osaka, Japan || 
|-id=321
| 3321 Dasha ||  || Dasha from Sevastopol (1836–1892), Russian sister of charity || 
|-id=322
| 3322 Lidiya ||  || Lydia Zvereva (1890–1916), the first Russian female aviator || 
|-id=323
| 3323 Turgenev ||  || Ivan Turgenev (1818–1883), Russian writer || 
|-id=324
| 3324 Avsyuk ||  || Yurii Nikolaevich Avsyuk, Russian geophysicist (specialist in gravimetry and geodynamics) || 
|-id=325
| 3325 TARDIS || 1984 JZ || The TARDIS, time machine in Doctor Who || 
|-id=326
| 3326 Agafonikov || 1985 FL || Askol'd M. Agafonikov, Russian geophysicist and navigator of the third Russian Antarctic expedition || 
|-id=327
| 3327 Campins || 1985 PW || Humberto Campins (Humberto Campins Camejo), Venezuelan-born American astronomer || 
|-id=328
| 3328 Interposita ||  || The discovery film was exposed hastily between two satellite laser ranging sessions in the adjacent dome. || 
|-id=329
| 3329 Golay ||  || Marcel Golay (1927–2015), Swiss astronomer at Geneva Observatory || 
|-id=330
| 3330 Gantrisch ||  || Gantrisch, a mountain south of Bern in Switzerland || 
|-id=331
| 3331 Kvistaberg || 1979 QS || Kvistaberg, site of Uppsala Observatory, Sweden || 
|-id=332
| 3332 Raksha ||  || Yurij Mikhajlovich Raksha (1937–1980), Russian artist || 
|-id=333
| 3333 Schaber ||  || Gerald Gene Schaber, American planetary geologist with the USGS || 
|-id=334
| 3334 Somov || 1981 YR || Mikhail Somov (1908–1973), Soviet Antarctic explorer || 
|-id=335
| 3335 Quanzhou || 1966 AA || Quanzhou, Fujian, China || 
|-id=336
| 3336 Grygar || 1971 UX || Jiří Grygar (born 1936), Czech astronomer || 
|-id=337
| 3337 Miloš ||  || Miloš Tichý (born 1966), Czech astronomer and discoverer of minor planets || 
|-id=338
| 3338 Richter ||  || Nikolaus B. Richter (1910–1980), first director of the Tautenburg Observatory (1960–1975) || 
|-id=339
| 3339 Treshnikov || 1978 LB || Alexey Tryoshnikov (1914–1991), Soviet Antarctic explorer || 
|-id=340
| 3340 Yinhai || 1979 TK || Yinhai, Guangxi, China || 
|-id=341
| 3341 Hartmann || 1980 OD || William Kenneth Hartmann (born 1939), American planetary scientist, writer, and painter || 
|-id=342
| 3342 Fivesparks ||  || In honor of Newton and Margaret Mayall (1902–1995), American astronomer. The name refers to their residence in Cambridge, Massachusetts || 
|-id=343
| 3343 Nedzel || 1982 HS || V. Alexander Nedzel, American supporter of the supporter of Lincoln Near-Earth Asteroid Research, which discovered this asteroid || 
|-id=344
| 3344 Modena || 1982 JA || Modena, city in Italy || 
|-id=345
| 3345 Tarkovskij ||  || Andrei Tarkovsky (1932–1986), Soviet film producer || 
|-id=346
| 3346 Gerla || 1951 SD || Gertrude Lawrence (1898–1952), English actress || 
|-id=347
| 3347 Konstantin ||  || Konstantin Kalinin (1889–1938), Soviet aviator || 
|-id=348
| 3348 Pokryshkin ||  || Alexander Pokryshkin (1913–1985), Soviet pilot || 
|-id=349
| 3349 Manas ||  || Manas, a Kyrgyz epic poem || 
|-id=350
| 3350 Scobee || 1980 PJ || Dick Scobee (1939–1986), STS-51-L crew member || 
|-id=351
| 3351 Smith ||  || Michael J. Smith (1945–1986), STS-51-L crew member || 
|-id=352
| 3352 McAuliffe || 1981 CW || Christa McAuliffe (1948–1986), STS-51-L crew member || 
|-id=353
| 3353 Jarvis || 1981 YC || Gregory Jarvis (1944–1986), STS-51-L crew member || 
|-id=354
| 3354 McNair || 1984 CW || Ronald McNair (1950–1986), STS-51-L crew member || 
|-id=355
| 3355 Onizuka ||  || Ellison Onizuka (1946–1986), STS-51-L crew member || 
|-id=356
| 3356 Resnik || 1984 EU || Judith Resnik (1949–1986), STS-51-L crew member || 
|-id=357
| 3357 Tolstikov || 1984 FT || Yevgeny Tolstikov (1913–1987), Russian meteorologist and Polar explorer who lead the third Soviet Antarctic expedition || 
|-id=358
| 3358 Anikushin || 1978 RX || Mikhail Anikushin (1917–1997), Russian sculptor || 
|-id=359
| 3359 Purcari ||  || Moldavian wine producer || 
|-id=360
| 3360 Syrinx || 1981 VA || Syrinx, a nymph || 
|-id=361
| 3361 Orpheus || 1982 HR || Orpheus, mythological Greek musician || 
|-id=362
| 3362 Khufu || 1984 QA || Khufu, Egyptian pharaoh || 
|-id=363
| 3363 Bowen || 1960 EE || Ira Sprague Bowen (1898–1973) was an American astronomer and director of the Mount Wilson and Palomar observatories || 
|-id=364
| 3364 Zdenka || 1984 GF || Zdeňka Vávrová (born 1945), Czech astronomer || 
|-id=365
| 3365 Recogne ||  || Recogne in the Ardennes, Belgium || 
|-id=366
| 3366 Gödel ||  || Kurt Gödel (1906–1978), Austro-Hungarian logician || 
|-id=367
| 3367 Alex ||  || Alex R. Baltutis, grandson of the discoverer || 
|-id=368
| 3368 Duncombe || 1985 QT || Raynor Lockwood Duncombe, American astronomer || 
|-id=369
| 3369 Freuchen || 1985 UZ || Peter Freuchen (1886–1957), Danish polar explorer and author || 
|-id=370
| 3370 Kohsai || 1934 CU || Hiroki Kosai (born 1933), Japanese astronomer || 
|-id=371
| 3371 Giacconi || 1955 RZ || Riccardo Giacconi (1931–2018), Italian-born American astrophysicist and winner (with Raymond Davis and Masatoshi Koshiba) of the Nobel Prize for Physics in 2002 || 
|-id=372
| 3372 Bratijchuk ||  || Matrena Vasil'evna Bratijchuk, Ukrainian astronomer || 
|-id=373
| 3373 Koktebelia ||  || Koktebel, a resort on the Black Sea in Crimea || 
|-id=374
| 3374 Namur || 1980 KO || Namur, capital of the region of Wallonia in Belgium || 
|-id=375
| 3375 Amy ||  || Amy Shoemaker Prescott, relative of the discoverer || 
|-id=376
| 3376 Armandhammer ||  || Armand Hammer (1898–1990), American industrialist and art collector || 
|-id=377
| 3377 Lodewijk || 4122 P-L || Lodewijk Woltjer (born 1930), Dutch astronomer || 
|-id=378
| 3378 Susanvictoria || A922 WB || Susan Titus and Victoria Van Biesbroeck Streeter, granddaughters of the discoverer || 
|-id=379
| 3379 Oishi ||  || Hideo Oishi, Japanese amateur astronomer and orbit computer || 
|-id=380
| 3380 Awaji || 1940 EF || Awaji Island, Japan || 
|-id=381
| 3381 Mikkola || 1941 UG || Seppo Mikkola (born 1947), Finnish astronomer || 
|-id=382
| 3382 Cassidy || 1948 RD || William A. Cassidy (born 1928), American meteoriticist || 
|-id=383
| 3383 Koyama || 1951 AB || Hisako Koyama, Japanese amateur astronomer || 
|-id=384
| 3384 Daliya ||  || Vladimir Dal (1801–1872), Russian lexicologist and ethnographer || 
|-id=385
| 3385 Bronnina ||  || Nina Mikhailovna Bronnikova, Russian astronomer at Pulkovo Observatory || 
|-id=386
| 3386 Klementinum || 1980 FA || The Clementinum, college in Prague || 
|-id=387
| 3387 Greenberg || 1981 WE || Richard J. Greenberg, American planetary scientist at the University of Arizona || 
|-id=388
| 3388 Tsanghinchi ||  || Hin-Chi Tsang, Chinese industrialist || 
|-id=389
| 3389 Sinzot || 1984 DU || Family name of the discoverer's grandmother || 
|-id=390
| 3390 Demanet ||  || The family name of the discoverer's paternal grandmother || 
|-id=391
| 3391 Sinon ||  || Sinon, mythical Greek warrior || 
|-id=392
| 3392 Setouchi || 1979 YB || Setouchi Region, Japan || 
|-id=393
| 3393 Štúr ||  || Ľudovít Štúr (1815–1856), Slovak leader and writer || 
|-id=394
| 3394 Banno || 1986 DB || Yoshiaki Banno (1952–1991), Japanese engineer and a discoverer of minor planets || 
|-id=395
| 3395 Jitka || 1985 UN || Jitka Beneš, Czech assistant at Klet Observatory || 
|-id=396
| 3396 Muazzez || A915 TE || Muazzez K. Lohmiller, staff member of the Smithsonian Astrophysical Observatory || 
|-id=397
| 3397 Leyla || 1964 XA || Nancy Leyla Lohmiller (born 1985), daughter of Muazzez Lohmiller || 
|-id=398
| 3398 Stättmayer || 1978 PC || Peter Stättmayer, German amateur astronomer, director of the Munich Public Observatory || 
|-id=399
| 3399 Kobzon ||  || Joseph Kobzon (1937–2018), Soviet singer || 
|-id=400
| 3400 Aotearoa || 1981 GX || Māori name for New Zealand || 
|}

3401–3500 

|-
| 3401 Vanphilos || 1981 PA || Vanessa Hall and Philip Osborne, on the occasion of their marriage. The name was given by Gareth V. Williams, astronomer at the Minor Planet Center and a friend of the couple. || 
|-id=402
| 3402 Wisdom || 1981 PB || Jack Wisdom, American astronomer at MIT || 
|-id=403
| 3403 Tammy || 1981 SW || Tammy Irelan, wife of R. L. Irelan staff member at Lincoln Laboratory's Experimental Test Site || 
|-id=404
| 3404 Hinderer || 1934 CY || Fritz Hinderer (1912–1991), German astronomer at Babelsberg Observatory || 
|-id=405
| 3405 Daiwensai || 1964 UQ || Wen-Sai Dai (1911–1979), Chinese astronomer || 
|-id=406
| 3406 Omsk || 1969 DA || Omsk, Russia || 
|-id=407
| 3407 Jimmysimms || 1973 DT || James A. C. Simms III (born 1957), American system administrator || 
|-id=408
| 3408 Shalamov ||  || Varlam Shalamov (1907–1982), Soviet writer || 
|-id=409
| 3409 Abramov ||  || Fyodor Abramov (1920–1983), Soviet writer || 
|-id=410
| 3410 Vereshchagin ||  || Vasily Vereshchagin (1842–1904), Russian painter || 
|-id=411
| 3411 Debetencourt || 1980 LK || The family name of the mother of astronomer Georges Roland, who co-discovered Comet Arend–Roland || 
|-id=412
| 3412 Kafka ||  || Franz Kafka (1883–1924), German-Czech writer || 
|-id=413
| 3413 Andriana ||  || Andriana Marie Hazelton, granddaughter of the discoverer Norman G. Thomas || 
|-id=414
| 3414 Champollion || 1983 DJ || Jean-François Champollion (1790–1832), French linguist || 
|-id=415
| 3415 Danby || 1928 SL || Michael Anthony Danby, British-born mathematician formerly of North Carolina State University || 
|-id=416
| 3416 Dorrit || 1931 VP || Dorrit Hoffleit (1907–2007), American astronomer || 
|-id=417
| 3417 Tamblyn || 1937 GG || Peter Tamblyn, American astronomer || 
|-id=418
| 3418 Izvekov ||  || Vladimir Andreevich Izvekov, Soviet astronomer || 
|-id=419
| 3419 Guth || 1981 JZ || Vladimír Guth (1905–1980), Slovak astronomer || 
|-id=420
| 3420 Standish || 1984 EB || E. Myles Standish Jr, American astronomer, Caltech/JPL || 
|-id=421
| 3421 Yangchenning ||  || Yang Chen-Ning (born 1922), Chinese-American physicist || 
|-id=422
| 3422 Reid || 1978 OJ || Ruth and Gordon Reid (1923–1989), professor of politics at the University of Western Australia || 
|-id=423
| 3423 Slouka || 1981 CK || Hubert Slouka (1903–1973), Czech astronomer || 
|-id=424
| 3424 Nušl || 1982 CD || František Nušl (1867–1951), Czech astronomer and mathematician || 
|-id=425
| 3425 Hurukawa || 1929 BD || Kiichirō Furukawa (Hurukawa, 1929–2016), Japanese astronomer and discoverer of minor planets || 
|-id=426
| 3426 Seki || 1932 CQ || Tsutomu Seki (born 1930), Japanese astronomer and discoverer of minor planets || 
|-id=427
| 3427 Szentmártoni || 1938 AD || Béla Szentmártoni (1931–1988), Hungarian amateur astronomer || 
|-id=428
| 3428 Roberts || 1952 JH || Walter Orr Roberts (1915–1990), American astronomer and atmospheric physicist || 
|-id=429
| 3429 Chuvaev ||  || Konstantin Konstantinovich Chuvaev (1917–1994), Soviet astronomer || 
|-id=430
| 3430 Bradfield ||  || William A. Bradfield (1927–2014), Australian amateur astronomer || 
|-id=431
| 3431 Nakano || 1984 QC || Shuichi Nakano (born 1947), Japanese astronomer || 
|-id=432
| 3432 Kobuchizawa || 1986 EE || Kobuchizawa Observatory in Japan which contributes asteroid (Near Earth Objects) observations to the Minor Planet Center || 
|-id=433
| 3433 Fehrenbach ||  || Charles Fehrenbach (1914–2008), French astronomer || 
|-id=434
| 3434 Hurless || 1981 VO || Carolyn Hurless (1934–1987), American amateur astronomer || 
|-id=435
| 3435 Boury ||  || Arsène Boury (1934–1982), Belgian astronomer || 
|-id=436
| 3436 Ibadinov ||  || Hursandkul Ibadinov, Tajik astronomer || 
|-id=437
| 3437 Kapitsa ||  || Pyotr Kapitsa (1894–1984), Russian physicist, winner of the Nobel Prize for Physics in 1978 || 
|-id=438
| 3438 Inarradas ||  || Argentine Institute of Radio Astronomy  || 
|-id=439
| 3439 Lebofsky ||  || Larry A. Lebofsky, American astronomer || 
|-id=440
| 3440 Stampfer || 1950 DD || Simon von Stampfer (1792–1864), Austrian geodesist and astronomer, pioneer of cinematography || 
|-id=441
| 3441 Pochaina ||  || , a tributary of the Dnieper in the Ukraine || 
|-id=442
| 3442 Yashin ||  || Lev Yashin (1929–1990), Soviet goalkeeper || 
|-id=443
| 3443 Leetsungdao ||  || Tsung-Dao Lee (born 1926), Chinese American physicist and winner of the Nobel Prize for Physics || 
|-id=444
| 3444 Stepanian ||  || Natalia Nikolaevna Stepanian (astrophysicist) and Arnol'd Artashesovich Stepanian (head of the gamma-ray laboratory) both astronomers at the Crimean Astrophysical Observatory || 
|-id=445
| 3445 Pinson || 1983 FC || William H. Pinson (1919–), American geochemist || 
|-id=446
| 3446 Combes || 1942 EB || Michel-Alain Combes (born 1942), French astronomer || 
|-id=447
| 3447 Burckhalter || 1956 SC || Charles Burckhalter (1849–1923), American astronomer || 
|-id=448
| 3448 Narbut ||  || Heorhiy Narbut (1886–1920),  Ukrainian graphic designer || 
|-id=449
| 3449 Abell ||  || George O. Abell (1927–1983), American astronomer || 
|-id=450
| 3450 Dommanget || 1983 QJ || Jean Dommanget, Belgian astronomer || 
|-id=451
| 3451 Mentor ||  || Mentor, mythological Greek king, son of Imbrus at Pedaseus, father of Imbrius, ally of the Trojans || 
|-id=452
| 3452 Hawke || 1980 OA || Bernard Ray Hawke, American planetary geologist at the University of Hawaii || 
|-id=453
| 3453 Dostoevsky ||  || Fyodor Dostoevsky (1821–1881), Russian writer || 
|-id=454
| 3454 Lieske ||  || Jay Henry Lieske, American astronomer || 
|-id=455
| 3455 Kristensen || 1985 QC || Leif Kahl Kristensen, Danish astronomer || 
|-id=456
| 3456 Etiennemarey ||  || Étienne-Jules Marey (1830–1904), French surgeon, physiologist, inventor of the chronophotograph, pioneer of cinematography, contemporary of Eadweard Muybridge || 
|-id=457
| 3457 Arnenordheim ||  || Arne Nordheim (1931–2010), Norwegian composer || 
|-id=458
| 3458 Boduognat ||  || Boduognaty or Boduognatus, leader of the Nervii in Gaul who, with the Atrebates and Viromandui, fought Julius Caesar in 57 BC || 
|-id=459
| 3459 Bodil || 1986 GB || Bodil Jensen, wife of the discoverer Poul Jensen || 
|-id=460
| 3460 Ashkova ||  || Nataliya Vladimirovna Ashkova, Soviet astronomer at the Institute for Theoretical Astronomy || 
|-id=461
| 3461 Mandelshtam ||  || Osip Mandelstam (1891–1938), Soviet poet || 
|-id=462
| 3462 Zhouguangzhao ||  || Zhou Guangzhao (born 1929), Chinese physicist || 
|-id=463
| 3463 Kaokuen ||  || Charles K. Kao (1933–2018), Chinese physicist || 
|-id=464
| 3464 Owensby || 1983 BA || Pamela D. Owensby, planetary astronomer at the University of Hawaii || 
|-id=465
| 3465 Trevires ||  || Ancient Belgian tribe, mentioned in Julius Caesar's Gallic Wars || 
|-id=466
| 3466 Ritina ||  || discoverer's daughter Margarita, who was also an astronomer at Crimean Astrophysical Observatory || 
|-id=467
| 3467 Bernheim ||  || Robert Burnham Jr. (1931–1993), American astronomer and discoverer of minor planets || 
|-id=468
| 3468 Urgenta || 1975 AM || Type of potato || 
|-id=469
| 3469 Bulgakov ||  || Mikhail Bulgakov (1891–1940), Russian writer || 
|-id=470
| 3470 Yaronika || 1975 ES || discoverer's son Yaroslav, who also works at CrAO || 
|-id=471
| 3471 Amelin ||  || Valentin Mikhailovich Amelin (1930–1989), Soviet geodesist || 
|-id=472
| 3472 Upgren ||  || Arthur Reinhold Upgren, American astronomer || 
|-id=473
| 3473 Sapporo || A924 EG || Sapporo, Hokkaido, Japan || 
|-id=474
| 3474 Linsley || 1962 HE || Earl Garfield Linsley (1882–1969), professor of geography at Mills College, California || 
|-id=475
| 3475 Fichte || 1972 TD || Hubert Fichte (1935–1986), German writer || 
|-id=476
| 3476 Dongguan ||  || Dongguan, Guangdong, China || 
|-id=477
| 3477 Kazbegi || 1979 KH || Mount Kazbek, on the border between Georgia and Russia || 
|-id=478
| 3478 Fanale || 1979 XG || Fraser Partington Fanale, American planetary geologist || 
|-id=479
| 3479 Malaparte || 1980 TQ || Curzio Malaparte (1898–1957), Italian writer || 
|-id=480
| 3480 Abante || 1981 GB || Robert Hamilton Brown, planetary astronomer at the Jet Propulsion Laboratory || 
|-id=481
| 3481 Xianglupeak ||  || Xianglu Peak ("Incense Burner Peak", 557 m), highest point of the Fragrant Hill Park, northwest of Beijing, China || 
|-id=482
| 3482 Lesnaya ||  || village Lesnaya, near which Swedes were defeated by the Russian army in the Battle of Lesnaya || 
|-id=483
| 3483 Svetlov ||  || Mikhail Svetlov (1903–1964), Soviet poet || 
|-id=484
| 3484 Neugebauer || 1978 NE || The Neugebauers, American family of physicists and mathematicians: Otto Neugebauer, historian of astronomy, Marcia Neugebauer and Gerald Neugebauer, both astronomers || 
|-id=485
| 3485 Barucci || 1983 NU || Maria A. Barucci, Italian astronomer and discoverer of minor planets || 
|-id=486
| 3486 Fulchignoni || 1984 CR || Marcello Fulchignoni, Italian astronomer || 
|-id=487
| 3487 Edgeworth || 1978 UF || Kenneth Edgeworth (1880–1972), Irish engineer || 
|-id=488
| 3488 Brahic || 1980 PM || André Brahic (1942–2016), French astronomer || 
|-id=489
| 3489 Lottie ||  || Lottie Soll-Herkenhoff, wife of co-discoverer Kenneth E. Herkenhoff || 
|-id=490
| 3490 Šolc || 1984 SV || Ivan Šolc, Czech inventor || 
|-id=491
| 3491 Fridolin ||  || Fridolin of Säckingen, an Irish missionary, is the patron saint of the Swiss valley of Glarus || 
|-id=492
| 3492 Petra-Pepi || 1985 DQ || Daughter of the discoverer || 
|-id=493
| 3493 Stepanov ||  || Vladimir Yevgenyevich Stepanov (1913–1986), Soviet physicist || 
|-id=494
| 3494 Purple Mountain || 1980 XW || Purple Mountain Observatory, Jiangsu, China || 
|-id=495
| 3495 Colchagua || 1981 NU || Colchagua Province, Chile || 
|-id=496
| 3496 Arieso || 1977 RC || name consists of acronyms of Astronomisches Rechen-Institut and the European Southern Observatory || 
|-id=497
| 3497 Innanen || 1941 HJ || Kimmo Innanen (1937–2011), Finnish-Canadian astronomer || 
|-id=498
| 3498 Belton ||  || Michael J. Belton (1934–2018), American astronomer || 
|-id=499
| 3499 Hoppe ||  || Johannes Hoppe (1907–?), German professor of astronomy at the University of Jena || 
|-id=500
| 3500 Kobayashi || A919 SD || Takao Kobayashi (born 1961), astronomer || 
|}

3501–3600 

|-
| 3501 Olegiya || 1971 QU || Oleg Nikolaevich Korotsev (born 1922), Russian astronomer || 
|-id=502
| 3502 Huangpu ||  || Huangpu District, Shanghai || 
|-id=503
| 3503 Brandt ||  || John Conrad Brandt, American astronomer and author || 
|-id=504
| 3504 Kholshevnikov ||  || Konstantin Vladislavovich Kholshevnikov, Russian astronomer and professor at Leningrad University || 
|-id=505
| 3505 Byrd || 1983 AM || Deborah Byrd (born 1951), producer of the Earth & Sky radio series || 
|-id=506
| 3506 French ||  || Linda M. French (born 1951), American Astronomer, Professor of Physics, Illinois Wesleyan University || 
|-id=507
| 3507 Vilas || 1982 UX || Faith Vilas (born 1952), American planetary scientist and Director of the MMT Observatory in Arizona || 
|-id=508
| 3508 Pasternak ||  || Boris Pasternak (1890–1960), Russian writer || 
|-id=509
| 3509 Sanshui ||  || Sanshui, Chinese city in the Sanshui District || 
|-id=510
| 3510 Veeder || 1982 TP || Glenn John Veeder, American astronomer || 
|-id=511
| 3511 Tsvetaeva ||  || Marina Tsvetaeva (1892–1941), Soviet poet || 
|-id=512
| 3512 Eriepa ||  || Erie, Pennsylvania || 
|-id=513
| 3513 Quqinyue || 1965 UZ || Qu Qinyue (born 1935), Chinese astronomer || 
|-id=514
| 3514 Hooke || 1971 UJ || Robert Hooke (1635–1703), English scientist || 
|-id=515
| 3515 Jindra ||  || Lumír Jindra (born 1936), Czech pharmacologist and friend of the discoverer || 
|-id=516
| 3516 Rusheva ||  || Nadya Rusheva (1952–1969), Russian painter || 
|-id=517
| 3517 Tatianicheva ||  || Lyudmila Tatianicheva (1915–1980), Soviet poet || 
|-id=518
| 3518 Florena ||  || Pavel Florensky (1882–1943), Russian religious philosopher, physicist and mathematician and hisson, Kirill Florensky (1915–1982), geochemist and mineralogist || 
|-id=519
| 3519 Ambiorix || 1984 DO || Ambiorix, leader of Belgian tribe in the time of the Romans || 
|-id=520
| 3520 Klopsteg || 1952 SG || Paul E. Klopsteg (1889–1991), American physicist || 
|-id=521
| 3521 Comrie || 1982 MH || Leslie Comrie (1893–1950), New Zealand-born astronomer and pioneer in mathematical computation || 
|-id=522
| 3522 Becker || 1941 SW ||  (1788–1858), Finnish author and academic || 
|-id=523
| 3523 Arina ||  || Arina Rodionovna Yakoleva (1758–1828), the nurse of Russian poet Alexander Pushkin || 
|-id=524
| 3524 Schulz ||  || Charles M. Schulz (1922–2000), cartoonist and creator of the comic strip Peanuts (Charlie Brown; Charlie Brown). || 
|-id=525
| 3525 Paul ||  || Paul J. Baltutis, son-in-law of the discoverer Norman G. Thomas || 
|-id=526
| 3526 Jeffbell || 1984 CN || Space scientist/writer Jeffrey F. Bell || 
|-id=527
| 3527 McCord ||  || Thomas Bard McCord, American astronomer (planetary geologist) || 
|-id=528
| 3528 Counselman ||  || Charles Claude Counselman III (born 1943), American planetary scientist || 
|-id=529
| 3529 Dowling ||  || Timothy Edward Dowling, American planetary scientist and professor at MIT || 
|-id=530
| 3530 Hammel ||  || Heidi Hammel (born 1960), American planetary scientist || 
|-id=531
| 3531 Cruikshank || 1981 FB || Dale Cruikshank, NASA space scientist || 
|-id=532
| 3532 Tracie ||  || Tracie Lynn Ojakangas, wife of co-discoverer Gregory Wayne Ojakangas || 
|-id=533
| 3533 Toyota || 1986 UE || Toyota, Aichi, Japan || 
|-id=534
| 3534 Sax || 1936 XA || Adolphe Sax (1814–1894), Belgian musical instrument designer, best known for inventing the saxophone || 
|-id=535
| 3535 Ditte ||  || The main character of Ditte, a human child novel by Martin Andersen Nexø || 
|-id=536
| 3536 Schleicher ||  || David Glenn Schleicher, American astronomer at Lowell Observatory || 
|-id=537
| 3537 Jürgen || 1982 VT || Jürgen Rahe (1939–1997), Director of NASA's Solar System Exploration Division || 
|-id=538
| 3538 Nelsonia || 6548 P-L || Elisabeth Nelson, secretary at Heidelberg Observatory and Max Planck Institute for Astronomy and took care of the investigators of the Palomar–Leiden Survey || 
|-id=539
| 3539 Weimar ||  || Weimar, Germany || 
|-id=540
| 3540 Protesilaos ||  || Protesilaos, mythical person related to Trojan War || 
|-id=541
| 3541 Graham || 1984 ML || Lloyd Wilson Graham (1940- ), executive director of the department of state services, who supported the Perth Observatory || 
|-id=542
| 3542 Tanjiazhen ||  || Tan Jiazhen (1909–2008), Chinese geneticist || 
|-id=543
| 3543 Ningbo ||  || Ningbo Chinese city || 
|-id=544
| 3544 Borodino ||  || Village in Russia, where the Battle of Borodino took place in 1812 || 
|-id=545
| 3545 Gaffey ||  || Michael James Gaffey (born 1945), American planetary geologist || 
|-id=546
| 3546 Atanasoff || 1983 SC || John Vincent Atanasoff (1903–1995), American (of Bulgarian descent) mathematician and physicist, inventor of the Atanasoff–Berry Computer || 
|-id=547
| 3547 Serov ||  || Valentin Serov (1865–1911), Russian painter || 
|-id=548
| 3548 Eurybates || 1973 SO || Eurybates, mythological Greek soldier || 
|-id=549
| 3549 Hapke || 1981 YH || Bruce Hapke (born 1931), American planetary scientist || 
|-id=550
| 3550 Link || 1981 YS || František Link (1906–1984), Czech astronomer || 
|-id=551
| 3551 Verenia || 1983 RD || First vestal virgin consecrated by the legendary Roman king Numa Pompilius || 
|-id=552
| 3552 Don Quixote || 1983 SA || Don Quixote, eponymous hero of the novel by Cervantes || 
|-id=553
| 3553 Mera || 1985 JA || Maera, a daughter of Praetus || 
|-id=554
| 3554 Amun || 1986 EB || Amun, Egyptian god || 
|-id=555
| 3555 Miyasaka ||  || Seidai Miyasaka (born 1955), Japanese astronomer and discoverer of minor planets || 
|-id=556
| 3556 Lixiaohua || 1964 UO || Li Xiaohua, Chinese industrialist from Beijing || 
|-id=557
| 3557 Sokolsky ||  || Andrej Georgievich Sokolskij, Soviet astronomer at ITA || 
|-id=558
| 3558 Shishkin ||  || Ivan Shishkin (1832–1898), Russian painter || 
|-id=559
| 3559 Violaumayer || 1980 PH || Martin Mayer, German amateur astronomer, operating from the Violau Public Observatory || 
|-id=560
| 3560 Chenqian ||  || Chen Qian, director of the History Museum of Chinese Astronomy, helped to popularize astronomy in China. || 
|-id=561
| 3561 Devine || 1983 HO || John Devine Hazelton, son-in-law of the discoverer Norman G. Thomas || 
|-id=562
| 3562 Ignatius || 1984 AZ || Ignatius of Loyola (1491–1556), founder of the Jesuit Order || 
|-id=563
| 3563 Canterbury || 1985 FE || Canterbury, New Zealand || 
|-id=564
| 3564 Talthybius ||  || Talthybius, mythological Greek soldier || 
|-id=565
| 3565 Ojima || 1986 YD || Ojima, Gunma, Japan, where the discoverers' observatory was situated || 
|-id=566
| 3566 Levitan ||  || Isaac Levitan (1860–1900), Russian painter || 
|-id=567
| 3567 Alvema || 1930 VD || The three great-granddaughters of the discoverer Eugène Joseph Delporte, Aline De Middelaer, and Véronique and Martine Warck || 
|-id=568
| 3568 ASCII || 1936 UB || ASCII Corporation, Japan || 
|-id=569
| 3569 Kumon ||  || Toru Kumon (1914–1995), Japanese educator || 
|-id=570
| 3570 Wuyeesun || 1979 XO || Wu Yee-sun (1900–2005), Chinese bonsai artist || 
|-id=571
| 3571 Milanštefánik || 1982 EJ || Milan Rastislav Štefánik, Slovak-French astronomer, meteorologist, general, one of the founders of Czechoslovakia || 
|-id=572
| 3572 Leogoldberg ||  || Leo Goldberg (1913–1987), American astronomer || 
|-id=573
| 3573 Holmberg ||  || Erik Holmberg (1908–2000), Swedish astronomer || 
|-id=574
| 3574 Rudaux || 1982 TQ || Lucien Rudaux (1874–1947), French astronomer || 
|-id=575
| 3575 Anyuta ||  || Anna Aleksandrovna Shishmareva, Soviet parachutist || 
|-id=576
| 3576 Galina ||  || Galina Bogdanovna Pyasetskaya, Soviet parachutist || 
|-id=577
| 3577 Putilin || 1969 TK || Ivan Ivanovich Putilin (1893–1954), Soviet minor planet researcher || 
|-id=578
| 3578 Carestia || 1977 CC || Reinaldo Augusto Carestia (1932–1993) researcher at the Felix Aguilar Observatory in Argentina || 
|-id=579
| 3579 Rockholt || 1977 YA || Ronald Rockholt (born 1928), scientist || 
|-id=580
| 3580 Avery ||  || Avery Jordan Thomas (born 1994), grandson of the discoverer || 
|-id=581
| 3581 Alvarez || 1985 HC || Luis Walter Alvarez (1911–1988) and his son Walter Alvarez (born 1940), discoverers of the Iridium layer associated with the meteor impact which killed the dinosaurs 65 million years ago. || 
|-id=582
| 3582 Cyrano ||  || Cyrano de Bergerac (1619–1655), French dramatist || 
|-id=583
| 3583 Burdett || 1929 TQ || Burdett, Kansas, hometown of discoverer Clyde Tombaugh || 
|-id=584
| 3584 Aisha || 1981 TW || Aisha Renee Thomas (born 1991), granddaughter of the discoverer Norman G. Thomas || 
|-id=585
| 3585 Goshirakawa || 1987 BE || Emperor Go-Shirakawa (1127–1192), Japan || 
|-id=586
| 3586 Vasnetsov ||  || Viktor Vasnetsov (1848–1926) and Apollinary Vasnetsov (1856–1933), Russian painters || 
|-id=587
| 3587 Descartes ||  || René Descartes (1596–1650), French philosopher || 
|-id=588
| 3588 Kirik ||  || Kirik the Novgorodian (c. 1110–1158), Novgorodian monk of the Antoniev Monastery || 
|-id=589
| 3589 Loyola ||  || Loyola, a Spanish town and birthplace of Ignatius of Loyola, founder of the Jesuit Order || 
|-id=590
| 3590 Holst || 1984 CQ || Gustav Holst (1874–1934), English composer || 
|-id=591
| 3591 Vladimirskij ||  || Boris Mikhajlovich Vladimirskij, astronomer at the Crimean Astrophysical Observatory || 
|-id=592
| 3592 Nedbal || 1980 CT || Oskar Nedbal (1874–1930), Czech composer || 
|-id=593
| 3593 Osip ||  || David J. Osip, researcher at Lowell Observatory || 
|-id=594
| 3594 Scotti || 1983 CN || James V. Scotti (born 1960), astronomer (member of Spacewatch team) || 
|-id=595
| 3595 Gallagher ||  || John S. Gallagher III, director of the Lowell Observatory || 
|-id=596
| 3596 Meriones || 1985 VO || Meriones, mythical Greek warrior || 
|-id=597
| 3597 Kakkuri || 1941 UL || Juhani Kakkuri, Finnish geodesist || 
|-id=598
| 3598 Saucier ||  || Agnes Saucier, grandmother of the American astronomer Ellen Howell, who discovered this minor planet || 
|-id=599
| 3599 Basov ||  || Nikolay Basov (1922–2001), Soviet physicist and Nobel Prize Laureate || 
|-id=600
| 3600 Archimedes ||  || Archimedes (c. 287–212 BC), ancient Greek scientist || 
|}

3601–3700 

|-
| 3601 Velikhov ||  || Evgenij Pavlovich Velikhov, Russian physicist and member of the Russian Academy of Sciences || 
|-id=602
| 3602 Lazzaro ||  || Daniela Lazzaro (born 1956), Brazilian astronomer || 
|-id=603
| 3603 Gajdušek || 1981 RM || Vilém Gajdušek (1895–1977), Czech telescope maker || 
|-id=604
| 3604 Berkhuijsen || 5550 P-L || E. M. Berkhuijsen, Dutch astronomer of the Max Planck Institute for Radio Astronomy in Germany || 
|-id=605
| 3605 Davy || 1932 WB ||  Named for Davy De Winter, son of the former administrator of the Royal Observatory of Belgium || 
|-id=606
| 3606 Pohjola || 1939 SF || Pohjola, location in Finnish mythology || 
|-id=607
| 3607 Naniwa ||  || Naniwa, traditional name of Osaka, Japan || 
|-id=608
| 3608 Kataev ||  || Valentin Petrovich Kataev (1897–1986), Soviet writer || 
|-id=609
| 3609 Liloketai ||  || Loke-Tai Li, Chinese educator || 
|-id=610
| 3610 Decampos ||  || José Adolfo Snajdauf de Campos, Brazilian astronomer at Valongo Observatory || 
|-id=611
| 3611 Dabu ||  || Dabu County, Guangdong, China || 
|-id=612
| 3612 Peale || 1982 TW || Stanton J. Peale (1937–2015), American astrophysicist and planetary astronomer || 
|-id=613
| 3613 Kunlun ||  || Kunlun, mountain range in northwest China || 
|-id=614
| 3614 Tumilty ||  || Jodi Anne Tumilty Thomas, daughter-in-law of the discoverer Norman G. Thomas || 
|-id=615
| 3615 Safronov || 1983 WZ || Viktor Safronov (1917–1999), Soviet astronomer || 
|-id=616
| 3616 Glazunov ||  || Ilya Glazunov (1930–2017), Russian painter || 
|-id=617
| 3617 Eicher || 1984 LJ || David J. Eicher (born 1961), American writer popularizer of astronomy and former editor-in-chief of Astronomy || 
|-id=618
| 3618 Kuprin ||  || Aleksandr Kuprin (1870–1938), Russian writer || 
|-id=619
| 3619 Nash ||  || Douglas B. Nash, American planetary scientist || 
|-id=620
| 3620 Platonov ||  || Andrei Platonov (1899–1951), Russian writer || 
|-id=621
| 3621 Curtis ||  || Curtis R. Carbutt (1911–1976), teacher of the discoverer Norman G. Thomas || 
|-id=622
| 3622 Ilinsky ||  || Igor Ilyinsky (1901–1987), Soviet actor || 
|-id=623
| 3623 Chaplin ||  || Charlie Chaplin (1889–1977), English comedy actor || 
|-id=624
| 3624 Mironov ||  || Andrei Mironov (1941–1987), Soviet actor and producer || 
|-id=625
| 3625 Fracastoro ||  || Mario Girolamo Fracastoro, Italian astronomer and former director of the Catania and the Pino Torinese observatories || 
|-id=626
| 3626 Ohsaki || 1929 PA || Shoji Osaki (1912–), Japanese astronomical historian || 
|-id=627
| 3627 Sayers || 1973 DS || Dorothy L. Sayers (1893–1957), British author || 
|-id=628
| 3628 Božněmcová || 1979 WD || Božena Němcová (1820–1862), Czech writer || 
|-id=629
| 3629 Lebedinskij || 1982 WK || Aleksandr Ignatevich Lebedinski (1913–1967), Soviet astronomer || 
|-id=630
| 3630 Lubomír || 1984 QN || Lubomír is a Slavic first name common in the South Bohemian Region || 
|-id=631
| 3631 Sigyn ||  || Daughter of the discoverer || 
|-id=632
| 3632 Grachevka ||  || Grachevka, a Russian village in Tambov Oblast (now Lipetsk Oblast), the birthplace of the discoverer's parents Stepan Chernykh and Melaniya Chernykh || 
|-id=633
| 3633 Mira ||  || Hugo Mira (1937–1994), researcher at Felix Aguilar Observatory, Argentina || 
|-id=634
| 3634 Iwan || 1980 FV || Iwan P. Williams, British astronomer || 
|-id=635
| 3635 Kreutz ||  || Heinrich Kreutz (1854–1907), German astronomer || 
|-id=636
| 3636 Pajdušáková ||  || Ľudmila Pajdušáková (1916–1979), Slovak astronomer || 
|-id=637
| 3637 O'Meara || 1984 UQ || Stephen James O'Meara, American astronomer, astronomy writer and author and contributing editor to Sky and Telescope || 
|-id=638
| 3638 Davis || 1984 WX || Donald R. Davis, senior scientist at the Planetary Science Institute in Tucson || 
|-id=639
| 3639 Weidenschilling || 1985 TX || Stuart J. Weidenschilling, American planetary scientist || 
|-id=640
| 3640 Gostin ||  || Victor Gostin (born 1940), an Australian geologist and researcher of Australian impact craters || 
|-id=641
| 3641 Williams Bay || A922 WC || Williams Bay, Wisconsin, home of Yerkes Observatory || 
|-id=642
| 3642 Frieden ||  || German for "peace" || 
|-id=643
| 3643 Tienchanglin ||  || Chang-Lin Tien (1935–2002), former Chancellor of the University of California at Berkeley || 
|-id=644
| 3644 Kojitaku || 1931 TW || Takuo Kojima (born 1955), Japanese astronomer and discoverer of minor planets || 
|-id=645
| 3645 Fabini || 1981 QZ || Tatiana Fabini (1943–1989), Slovak astronomy writer || 
|-id=646
| 3646 Aduatiques ||  || Aduatiques (Aduatuci), an ancient tribe from Namur, Belgium || 
|-id=647
| 3647 Dermott ||  || Stanley Dermott, British-American astronomer || 
|-id=648
| 3648 Raffinetti || 1957 HK || Virgilio Raffinetti (1869–1946), Argentine astronomer and a director of La Plata Observatory || 
|-id=649
| 3649 Guillermina || 1976 HQ || Maria Guillermina Martin de Cesco (born 1915), widow and mother of Argentine astronomers Carlos Cesco and Mario R. Cesco, respectively || 
|-id=650
| 3650 Kunming ||  || Kunming, Yunnan, China || 
|-id=651
| 3651 Friedman ||  || Louis Friedman (born 1941), co-founder of the Planetary Society, and his wife, Connie || 
|-id=652
| 3652 Soros ||  || George Soros (born 1930), Hungarian-born American businessman and philosopher || 
|-id=653
| 3653 Klimishin ||  || Ivan Antonovich Klimishin, Russian astronomer || 
|-id=654
| 3654 AAS ||  || American Astronomical Society || 
|-id=655
| 3655 Eupraksia ||  || wife of prince Fyodor of Ryazan, who lived in the 13th century, she preferred to kill herself to being taken prisoner by Mongol-Tatars || 
|-id=656
| 3656 Hemingway || 1978 QX || Ernest Hemingway (1899–1961), US writer || 
|-id=657
| 3657 Ermolova ||  || Maria Yermolova (1853–1928), Russian actress || 
|-id=658
| 3658 Feldman || 1982 TR || Paul D. Feldman, American astronomer, and Paul A. Feldman, Canadian radioastronomer || 
|-id=659
| 3659 Bellingshausen ||  || Fabian Gottlieb von Bellingshausen (1778–1852), Antarctic explorer, who in 1819–1821 lead the first Russian Antarctic expedition || 
|-id=660
| 3660 Lazarev ||  || Mikhail Lazarev (1788–1851), Russian admiral || 
|-id=661
| 3661 Dolmatovskij ||  || Yevgeniy Dolmatovsky (1915–1994), Soviet poet || 
|-id=662
| 3662 Dezhnev ||  || Semyon Dezhnev (c. 1605–1673), Russian explorer || 
|-id=663
| 3663 Tisserand ||  || Félix Tisserand (1845–1896), French astronomer || 
|-id=664
| 3664 Anneres || 4260 P-L || Anna Theresia ("Anneres") Schmadel, wife of German astronomer Lutz D. Schmadel || 
|-id=665
| 3665 Fitzgerald || 1979 FE || Ella Fitzgerald, American jazz singer || 
|-id=666
| 3666 Holman || 1979 HP || Matthew J. Holman, American astronomer || 
|-id=667
| 3667 Anne-Marie || 1981 EF || Anne-Marie Malotki, a friend of the discoverer Edward L. G. Bowell || 
|-id=668
| 3668 Ilfpetrov ||  || Ilf and Petrov, Soviet writers || 
|-id=669
| 3669 Vertinskij ||  || Alexander Vertinsky (1889–1957), Russian actor, poet and composer || 
|-id=670
| 3670 Northcott || 1983 BN || Ruth J. Northcott (1913–1969), Canadian astronomer || 
|-id=671
| 3671 Dionysus || 1984 KD || Dionysus, Greek god of wine || 
|-id=672
| 3672 Stevedberg || 1985 QQ || Stephen J. Edberg (born 1952), American astronomer || 
|-id=673
| 3673 Levy || 1985 QS || David H. Levy (born 1948), Canadian astronomer and author || 
|-id=674
| 3674 Erbisbühl || 1963 RH || Mountain in Germany and location of the Sonneberg Observatory || 
|-id=675
| 3675 Kemstach ||  || Russian Marfa Vladimirovna Kemstach (1888–1971) and Semen Stepanovich Kemstach (1880–1938), grandparents of the discoverer Lyudmila Karachkina || 
|-id=676
| 3676 Hahn || 1984 GA || Gerhard Hahn, planetary astronomer at Uppsala Observatory || 
|-id=677
| 3677 Magnusson ||  || Per Magnusson, planetary astronomer at the Swedish Uppsala Observatory || 
|-id=678
| 3678 Mongmanwai || 1966 BO || Mong Man Wai (1927–2010), Chinese businessman || 
|-id=679
| 3679 Condruses || 1984 DT || Condruzes or Condruses, ancient inhabitants of what is now the Condroz, Belgium || 
|-id=680
| 3680 Sasha || 1987 MY || Alexandra Rachel Druyen Sagan (born 1982), daughter of Carl Sagan and Ann Druyan || 
|-id=681
| 3681 Boyan ||  || Boyan, an 11th-century Russian bard at the court of Yaroslav the Wise || 
|-id=682
| 3682 Welther || A923 NB || Barbara Welther (born 1938), historian of science at the Harvard–Smithsonian Center for Astrophysics || 
|-id=683
| 3683 Baumann || 1987 MA || Paul Baumann (1901–1976) and his wife Helene (1899–1986), German amateur astronomers || 
|-id=684
| 3684 Berry || 1983 AK || Richard Berry, editor-in-chief of Astronomy || 
|-id=685
| 3685 Derdenye ||  || Derald and Denise Nye, amateur astronomers in Tucson, Arizona || 
|-id=686
| 3686 Antoku || 1987 EB || Emperor Antoku (1178–1185), Japan || 
|-id=687
| 3687 Dzus || A908 TC || Paul K. Dzus, assistant and volunteer at the Minor Planet Center in the 1980s || 
|-id=688
| 3688 Navajo || 1981 FD || Navajo, Native American people in Arizona, New Mexico and Utah || 
|-id=689
| 3689 Yeates ||  || Anthony N. Yeates, Australian geologist || 
|-id=690
| 3690 Larson || 1981 PM || Stephen M. Larson, planetary scientist at the Lunar and Planetary Laboratory and a discoverer of minor planets || 
|-id=691
| 3691 Bede || 1982 FT || The Venerable Bede (673–735), English monk and historian || 
|-id=692
| 3692 Rickman ||  || Hans Rickman (born 1949), planetary astronomer at Uppsala Observatory || 
|-id=693
| 3693 Barringer || 1982 RU || Daniel Barringer (1860–1929), and pioneer investigator of terrestrial meteorite craters and after whom the Barringer Crater is named || 
|-id=694
| 3694 Sharon ||  || Sharon Rachel Vinick, friend of the discoverer Arie William Grossman || 
|-id=695
| 3695 Fiala ||  || Alan D. Fiala (born 1942), American staff astronomer with the USNO who became Chief of the U.S. Nautical Almanac Office in 1992 || 
|-id=696
| 3696 Herald || 1980 OF || David R. Herald, Australian amateur astronomer || 
|-id=697
| 3697 Guyhurst || 1984 EV || Guy Hurst, British amateur astronomer from Basingstoke, south central England, who has been observing comets since 1970 Src || 
|-id=698
| 3698 Manning ||  || Brian G. W. Manning (1926–2011), British amateur cometary astrometrist || 
|-id=699
| 3699 Milbourn ||  || Stanley William Milbourn, editor of the circulars of the British Astronomical Association || 
|-id=700
| 3700 Geowilliams ||  || George E. Williams, an Australian geologist, who discovered the Acraman crater, a meteorite impact crater in South Australia || 
|}

3701–3800 

|-
| 3701 Purkyně || 1985 DW || Jan Evangelista Purkyně (1787–1869), Czech anatomist, patriot, and physiologist || 
|-id=702
| 3702 Trubetskaya || 1970 NB || Ekaterina Ivanovna Trubetskaya (1800–1854), Russian princess, wife of a Decembrist || 
|-id=703
| 3703 Volkonskaya ||  || Mariya Nikolayevna Volkonskaya (1805–1863), Russian princess, wife of a Decembrist || 
|-id=704
| 3704 Gaoshiqi ||  || Gao Shi-Qi (1905–1988), the founder of science popularization in China || 
|-id=705
| 3705 Hotellasilla ||  || Erich Schumann", long-time manager of the Hotel La Silla" at La Silla Observatory in Chile || 
|-id=706
| 3706 Sinnott ||  || Roger W. Sinnott, associate editor of Sky & Telescope || 
|-id=707
| 3707 Schröter || 1934 CC || Johann Hieronymus Schröter (1745–1816), German astronomer and selenographer || 
|-id=708
| 3708 Socus ||  || Socus, defending his brother, wounded Odysseus with a spear throw that would have been fatal had not the goddess Athena deflected it. Odysseus then speared Socus in the back and taunted him as he perished. || 
|-id=709
| 3709 Polypoites ||  || Polypoites, mythical Greek warrior || 
|-id=710
| 3710 Bogoslovskij ||  || Nikita Bogoslovsky (1913–2004), Russian composer and writer || 
|-id=711
| 3711 Ellensburg || 1983 QD || City of Ellensburg, Washington, United States || 
|-id=712
| 3712 Kraft || 1984 YC || Robert Kraft (1927–2015), American professor of astronomy and astrophysics and chairman of the IAU || 
|-id=713
| 3713 Pieters ||  || Carle M. Pieters (born 1943), American geologist and planetary scientist || 
|-id=714
| 3714 Kenrussell ||  || Kenneth S. Russell, Australian astronomer and a discoverer of minor planets and comets. He has been working with the UK Schmidt Telescope for many years. || 
|-id=715
| 3715 Štohl || 1980 DS || Ján Štohl (1932–1993), Slovak astronomer || 
|-id=716
| 3716 Petzval || 1980 TG || József Miska Petzval (1807–1891), Hungarian engineer and mathematician || 
|-id=717
| 3717 Thorenia || 1964 CG || Victor Eugene Thoren (1935–1991), historian of astronomy at Indiana University || 
|-id=718
| 3718 Dunbar ||  || R. Scott Dunbar, American physicist, planetary scientist and discoverer of minor planets || 
|-id=719
| 3719 Karamzin ||  || Nikolay Karamzin (1766–1826), Russian historian || 
|-id=720
| 3720 Hokkaido ||  || Hokkaidō, Japan || 
|-id=721
| 3721 Widorn || 1982 TU || Thomas Widorn, Austrian astronomer || 
|-id=722
| 3722 Urata || 1927 UE || Takeshi Urata (1947–2012), Japanese astronomer and discoverer of minor planets || 
|-id=723
| 3723 Voznesenskij ||  || Andrei Voznesensky (1933–2010), Russian poet || 
|-id=724
| 3724 Annenskij ||  || Innokenty Annensky (1855–1909), Russian poet and writer || 
|-id=725
| 3725 Valsecchi ||  || Giovanni B. Valsecchi, Italian astronomer at the National Institute for Astrophysics || 
|-id=726
| 3726 Johnadams || 1981 LJ || John Adams (1735–1826), American president || 
|-id=727
| 3727 Maxhell || 1981 PQ || Maximilian Hell (1720–1792), Hungarian astronomer and Jesuit priest || 
|-id=728
| 3728 IRAS || 1983 QF || IRAS, the Infrared Astronomical Satellite || 
|-id=729
| 3729 Yangzhou ||  || Yangzhou, Jiangsu, China || 
|-id=730
| 3730 Hurban ||  || Jozef Miloslav Hurban (1817–1888), Slovak poet, writer, journalist, editor, critic || 
|-id=731
| 3731 Hancock ||  || John Hancock (1737–1793), American politician || 
|-id=732
| 3732 Vávra ||  || Anton Alfred Vávra, father of the discoverer || 
|-id=733
| 3733 Yoshitomo || 1985 AF || Minamoto no Yoshitomo (1123–1160), early Japanese samurai || 
|-id=734
| 3734 Waland || 9527 P-L || Robert L. Waland, Scottish optician who developed new techniques for making the optics of Schmidt telescopes || 
|-id=735
| 3735 Třeboň || 1983 XS || Třeboň, Czech Republic || 
|-id=736
| 3736 Rokoske ||  || Thomas Leo Rokoske, professor of physics and astronomy at the Appalachian State University in North Carolina || 
|-id=737
| 3737 Beckman || 1983 PA || Arnold O. Beckman (1900–2004), American chemist and inventor of the pH meter || 
|-id=738
| 3738 Ots ||  || Georg Ots (1920–1975), Estonian opera singer || 
|-id=739
| 3739 Rem ||  || Rem Viktorovich Khokhlov (1926–1977), Soviet physicist and co-founder of nonlinear optics || 
|-id=740
| 3740 Menge || 1981 EM || Sergio Menge de Freitas, vice-director of the Valongo Observatory, Brazil || 
|-id=741
| 3741 Rogerburns ||  || Roger Burns (1937–1994), New Zealand mineralogist || 
|-id=742
| 3742 Sunshine ||  || Jessica M. Sunshine, visiting scientist at MIT || 
|-id=743
| 3743 Pauljaniczek || 1983 EW || Paul Janiczek (born 1937), American astronomer || 
|-id=744
| 3744 Horn-d'Arturo || 1983 VE || Guido Horn d'Arturo (1879–1967), Italian astronomer || 
|-id=745
| 3745 Petaev || 1949 SF || Michail Ivanovich Petaev, visiting planetary geologist at Harvard–Smithsonian Center for Astrophysics || 
|-id=746
| 3746 Heyuan ||  || Heyuan, Guangdong, China || 
|-id=747
| 3747 Belinskij ||  || Vissarion Belinsky (1811–1848), Russian literary critic || 
|-id=748
| 3748 Tatum || 1981 JQ || Jeremy B. Tatum, Canadian astronomer || 
|-id=749
| 3749 Balam ||  || David D. Balam, Canadian astronomer and discoverer of minor planets || 
|-id=750
| 3750 Ilizarov ||  || Gavriil Ilizarov (1921–1992), Soviet orthopedic surgeon || 
|-id=751
| 3751 Kiang || 1983 NK || Tao Kiang, astronomer at Dunsink Observatory, near Dublin || 
|-id=752
| 3752 Camillo || 1985 PA || Camillo, son of the early Roman King Turno || 
|-id=753
| 3753 Cruithne || 1986 TO || Cruithne, ancient British tribe || 
|-id=754
| 3754 Kathleen || 1931 FM || Kathleen Willoughby Clifford, granddaughter of discoverer Clyde Tombaugh || 
|-id=755
| 3755 Lecointe || 1950 SJ || Georges Lecointe (1869–1929), Belgian astronomer and explorer || 
|-id=756
| 3756 Ruscannon ||  || Russell David Cannon, British astronomer || 
|-id=757
| 3757 Anagolay || 1982 XB || Anagolay is the goddess of lost things in ancient Philippine Tagalog mythology. Name suggested by the SGAC Name An Asteroid Campaign || 
|-id=758
| 3758 Karttunen || 1983 WP || Hannu Karttunen, Finnish astronomer || 
|-id=759
| 3759 Piironen || 1984 AP || Jukka Piironen, Finnish astronomer at the Finnish Meteorological Institute in Helsinki || 
|-id=760
| 3760 Poutanen || 1984 AQ || Markku Poutanen, Finnish astronomer and geodesist || 
|-id=761
| 3761 Romanskaya || 1936 OH || Sofia Romanskaya (1886–1969), Russian astronomer || 
|-id=762
| 3762 Amaravella ||  || Amaravella group of Russian painters, they represented Russian cosmism style || 
|-id=763
| 3763 Qianxuesen ||  || Qian Xuesen (1911–2009), Chinese aerodynamicist and cyberneticist || 
|-id=764
| 3764 Holmesacourt ||  || Robert Holmes a Court (1937–1990), Australian lawyer, businessman and collector || 
|-id=765
| 3765 Texereau ||  || Jean Texereau, optical engineer in the optical laboratory at Paris Observatory and author of the classic How to Make a Telescope || 
|-id=766
| 3766 Junepatterson || 1983 BF || June C. Patterson (1923–1988) amateur astronomer of Sierra Vista, Arizona || 
|-id=767
| 3767 DiMaggio || 1986 LC || Joe DiMaggio (1914–1999), American baseball player || 
|-id=768
| 3768 Monroe || 1937 RB || Marilyn Monroe (1926–1962), American actress || 
|-id=769
| 3769 Arthurmiller || 1967 UV || Arthur Miller (1915–2005), American playwright, essayist, and author || 
|-id=770
| 3770 Nizami ||  || Nizami Ganjavi (1141–1209), Persian poet || 
|-id=771
| 3771 Alexejtolstoj ||  || Aleksey Nikolayevich Tolstoy (1883–1945), Russian writer || 
|-id=772
| 3772 Piaf ||  || Édith Piaf (1915–1963), French singer || 
|-id=773
| 3773 Smithsonian || 1984 YY || Smithsonian Institution, American museum || 
|-id=774
| 3774 Megumi || 1987 YC || Megumi, wife of Japanese astronomer Takuo Kojima who discovered this minor planet || 
|-id=775
| 3775 Ellenbeth ||  || Ellen Elizabeth Willoughby, granddaughter of the discoverer Clyde Tombaugh || 
|-id=776
| 3776 Vartiovuori || 1938 GG || Hill in Turku, Finland on which the first observatory was built by Argelander || 
|-id=777
| 3777 McCauley ||  || Francis McCauley, geologist with the USGS || 
|-id=778
| 3778 Regge ||  || Tullio Regge (1931–2014), Italian theoretical physicist at Turin University || 
|-id=779
| 3779 Kieffer ||  || Hugh H. Kieffer, American geophysicist with the USGS || 
|-id=780
| 3780 Maury || 1985 RL || Alain Maury (born 1958), French astronomer and discoverer of minor planets || 
|-id=781
| 3781 Dufek ||  || George J. Dufek (1903–1977), American Antarctic explorer and Rear Admiral || 
|-id=782
| 3782 Celle || 1986 TE || German town of Celle in Lower Saxony || 
|-id=783
| 3783 Morris ||  || Charles S. Morris, observer of comets (presumed: Charles S. Morris Observatory) || 
|-id=784
| 3784 Chopin ||  || Frédéric Chopin (1810–1849), Polish composer || 
|-id=785
| 3785 Kitami || 1986 WM || Kitami, Japan || 
|-id=786
| 3786 Yamada || 1988 AE || Sakao Yamada, Japanese engineer || 
|-id=787
| 3787 Aivazovskij ||  || Ivan Aivazovsky (1817–1900), Russian painter || 
|-id=788
| 3788 Steyaert ||  || Christian Steyaert (born 1955), Belgian amateur astronomer, president of the Belgian (Flemish) astronomical society Vereniging voor Sterrenkunde from 1988 to 2004 || 
|-id=789
| 3789 Zhongguo || 1928 UF || Chinese name for China || 
|-id=790
| 3790 Raywilson || 1937 UE || Raymond Wilson (1928–2018), astronomical optician and pioneer of active optics || 
|-id=791
| 3791 Marci ||  || Jan Marek Marci (1595–1667), Czech physician, physicist, astronomer, and natural philosopher || 
|-id=792
| 3792 Preston || 1985 FA || Richard Preston (born 1954), American author of the astronomy book First Light || 
|-id=793
| 3793 Leonteus ||  || Leonteus, mythical person related to Trojan War || 
|-id=794
| 3794 Sthenelos ||  || Sthenelos, mythical person related to Trojan War || 
|-id=795
| 3795 Nigel ||  || Nigel Henbest (born 1951), British author, co-founder of Pioneer TV Productions || 
|-id=796
| 3796 Lene || 1986 XJ || Lene Augustesen, daughter of Danish astronomer Karl Augustesen, college of discoverer Poul Jensen at Brorfelde Observatory || 
|-id=797
| 3797 Ching-Sung Yu || 1987 YL || Ching-Sung Yu, Chinese astronomer || 
|-id=798
| 3798 de Jager || 2402 T-3 || Cornelis de Jager (1921–), Dutch astronomer || 
|-id=799
| 3799 Novgorod ||  || Novgorod, Russia || 
|-id=800
| 3800 Karayusuf || 1984 AB || Alford S. Karayusuf, supporter of near-Earth asteroid research projects at JPL || 
|}

3801–3900 

|-
| 3801 Thrasymedes || 1985 VS || Thrasymedes, mythical person related to Trojan War || 
|-id=802
| 3802 Dornburg ||  || Dornburg, a German town near the discovering Tautenburg Observatory || 
|-id=803
| 3803 Tuchkova ||  || Margarita Mikhailovna Tuchkova (1781–1852), Russian, founder of Spaso-Borodinsky monastery || 
|-id=804
| 3804 Drunina ||  || Yulia Drunina (1924–1991), Soviet poet || 
|-id=805
| 3805 Goldreich ||  || Peter Goldreich (born 1939), an American astrophysicist || 
|-id=806
| 3806 Tremaine ||  || Scott D. Tremaine (born 1950), Canadian astrophysicist || 
|-id=807
| 3807 Pagels ||  || Heinz Pagels (1939–1988), an American physicist || 
|-id=808
| 3808 Tempel ||  || Wilhelm Tempel (1821–1889), German astronomer || 
|-id=809
| 3809 Amici || 1984 FA || Giovanni Battista Amici (1786–1863), Italian astronomer || 
|-id=810
| 3810 Aoraki || 1985 DX || Aoraki / Mount Cook is the highest mountain in New Zealand || 
|-id=811
| 3811 Karma || 1953 TH || Karma, Hindu philosophy || 
|-id=812
| 3812 Lidaksum ||  || Li Dak-sum, (1920–) Chinese entrepreneur and philanthropist || 
|-id=813
| 3813 Fortov ||  || Vladimir Fortov (born 1946), a Russian physicist and expert in thermal physics, shock waves, and plasma physics || 
|-id=814
| 3814 Hoshi-no-mura || 1981 JA || Job training school for disabled persons. "Hoshi no mura" is meaning "Star village" in Japanese || 
|-id=815
| 3815 König || 1959 GG || Arthur König (1895–1969), German astronomer and discoverer of this minor planet. It was named by the other two discoverers, Gerhard Jackisch and Wolfgang Wenzel || 
|-id=816
| 3816 Chugainov ||  || Pavel Fedorovich Chugainov (1933–1992), long-time astronomer at the Crimean Astrophysical Observatory || 
|-id=817
| 3817 Lencarter ||  || Leonard J. Carter, of the British Interplanetary Society || 
|-id=818
| 3818 Gorlitsa ||  || Mariya Avksent'evna Rudenko, a village schoolmistress in the Mohyliv-Podilskyi Raion of Ukraine || 
|-id=819
| 3819 Robinson || 1983 AR || Leif J. Robinson, editor of the monthly American magazine Sky & Telescope || 
|-id=820
| 3820 Sauval || 1984 DV || Henri Sauval (1623–1676), French historian || 
|-id=821
| 3821 Sonet ||  || Jean Sonet (1908–1987), a Belgian Jesuit || 
|-id=822
| 3822 Segovia ||  || Andrés Segovia (1893–1987), guitarist || 
|-id=823
| 3823 Yorii ||  || Yorii, a Japanese town in the Saitama Prefecture || 
|-id=824
| 3824 Brendalee || 1929 TK || Brenda Willoughby Anderson, granddaughter of the American discoverer Clyde Tombaugh || 
|-id=825
| 3825 Nürnberg || 1967 UR || Nuremberg, a city in Germany || 
|-id=826
| 3826 Handel ||  || George Frideric Handel (1685–1759), German baroque composer || 
|-id=827
| 3827 Zdeněkhorský || 1986 VU || Zdeněk Horský (1929–1988), Czech historian-astronomer || 
|-id=828
| 3828 Hoshino || 1986 WC || Jiro Hoshino, Japanese amateur astronomer || 
|-id=829
| 3829 Gunma || 1988 EM || Gunma, a prefecture of Japan || 
|-id=830
| 3830 Trelleborg || 1986 RL || Trelleborg, southernmost Swedish city and nearby located Brorfelde Observatory || 
|-id=831
| 3831 Pettengill ||  || Gordon Pettengill (1926–2021), an American radio astronomer and planetary physicist at MIT || 
|-id=832
| 3832 Shapiro || 1981 QJ || Irwin I. Shapiro (born 1926), an American astrophysicist and professor at Harvard University || 
|-id=833
| 3833 Calingasta || 1971 SC || Calingasta, department in San Juan, Argentina, where the discovering Leoncito Astronomical Complex is located || 
|-id=834
| 3834 Zappafrank || 1980 JE || Frank Zappa (1940–1993), American musician || 
|-id=835
| 3835 Korolenko ||  || Vladimir Korolenko (1853–1921), Russian writer || 
|-id=836
| 3836 Lem ||  || Stanisław Lem (1921–2006), Polish writer || 
|-id=837
| 3837 Carr ||  || Michael Harold Carr, planetary geologist with the USGS || 
|-id=838
| 3838 Epona || 1986 WA || Epona, Gallo-Roman goddess of horses, ponies, donkeys and mules || 
|-id=839
| 3839 Bogaevskij || 1971 OU || Konstantin Bogaevsky (1872–1943), Russian painter || 
|-id=840
| 3840 Mimistrobell ||  || Mary E. Strobell, geologist with the USGS || 
|-id=841
| 3841 Dicicco ||  || Dennis DiCicco, editor of Sky & Telescope || 
|-id=842
| 3842 Harlansmith ||  || Harlan Smith (1924–1991), American astronomer || 
|-id=843
| 3843 OISCA || 1987 DM || The Organization for Industrial, Spiritual and Cultural Advancement (OISCA), || 
|-id=844
| 3844 Lujiaxi || 1966 BZ || Lu Jiaxi (1915–2001), Chinese physical chemist || 
|-id=845
| 3845 Neyachenko ||  || Ilya Isaakovich Neyachenko, Russian journalist and amateur astronomer || 
|-id=846
| 3846 Hazel ||  || Hazel Arthur Spellmann (1896–1968), mother of the discoverer Carolyn Shoemaker || 
|-id=847
| 3847 Šindel ||  || Jan Šindel (c. 1375 – c. 1456), medieval Czech astronomer, mathematician, physician, and professor || 
|-id=848
| 3848 Analucia ||  || Ana Lucia Martins, friend of Belgian discoverer Henri Debehogne || 
|-id=849
| 3849 Incidentia || 1984 FC || Roger W. Martin, graduate of the Electrical and Computer Engineering Department at UC and expert in asteroid science || 
|-id=850
| 3850 Peltier ||  || Leslie Peltier (1900–1980), American amateur astronomer || 
|-id=851
| 3851 Alhambra || 1986 UZ || Alhambra palace in Spain || 
|-id=852
| 3852 Glennford ||  || Glenn Ford (1916–2006), a Canadian actor during Hollywood's Golden Age || 
|-id=853
| 3853 Haas ||  || Walter H. Haas (1917–2015), an American amateur astronomer and founder of the Association of Lunar and Planetary Observers (ALPO) || 
|-id=854
| 3854 George || 1983 EA || George Estel Shoemaker (1904–1960), father-in-law of American discoverer Carolyn Shoemaker || 
|-id=855
| 3855 Pasasymphonia ||  || The Pasadena Symphony and Pops, an American orchestra based in Pasadena, California || 
|-id=856
| 3856 Lutskij || 1976 QX || Valery Konstantinovich Lutsky, Russian astronomer and scientific commentator on astronomy || 
|-id=857
| 3857 Cellino ||  || Alberto Cellino, Italian astronomer at the Observatory of Turin (Pino Torinese) || 
|-id=858
| 3858 Dorchester || 1986 TG || Dorchester, a county town of Dorset in South West England || 
|-id=859
| 3859 Börngen || 1987 EW || Freimut Börngen (1930–2021), German astronomer || 
|-id=860
| 3860 Plovdiv ||  || Plovdiv, Bulgaria || 
|-id=861
| 3861 Lorenz || A910 FA || Konrad Lorenz (1903–1989), Austrian ethologist and 1973 Nobel Prize laureate || 
|-id=862
| 3862 Agekian || 1972 KM || Tateos Agekian, Russian astrophysicist || 
|-id=863
| 3863 Gilyarovskij ||  || Vladimir Gilyarovsky (1853–1935), a Russian writer and newspaper journalist || 
|-id=864
| 3864 Søren || 1986 XF || Soren Augustesen, son of Danish discoverer Poul Jensen || 
|-id=865
| 3865 Lindbloom ||  || George G. Lindbloom (1934–1989), artist, designer, writer, cartoonist, teacher, photographer and humorist || 
|-id=866
| 3866 Langley ||  || Samuel Pierpont Langley (1834–1906), an American astronomer, physicist, inventor of the bolometer and pioneer of aviation || 
|-id=867
| 3867 Shiretoko || 1988 HG || Shiretoko Peninsula, Japan || 
|-id=868
| 3868 Mendoza || 4575 P-L || Eugenio E. Mendoza V. (born 1928) astronomer and an expert on photometry and spectroscopy || 
|-id=869
| 3869 Norton || 1981 JE || Arthur Philip Norton (1876–1955), British amateur astronomer (Norton's Star Atlas) || 
|-id=870
| 3870 Mayré ||  || Mayré Elst, daughter of Belgian discoverer Eric Walter Elst || 
|-id=871
| 3871 Reiz ||  || Anders Reiz (1915–2000), a Danish astronomer † || 
|-id=872
| 3872 Akirafujii || 1983 AV || Akira Fujii (born 1941), Japanese astronomer || 
|-id=873
| 3873 Roddy || 1984 WB || David J. Roddy (1932–2002), American astrogeologist, researcher of terrestrial impact craters || 
|-id=874
| 3874 Stuart ||  || Stuart E. Jones, astronomer and photographic specialist at the Lowell Observatory || 
|-id=875
| 3875 Staehle || 1988 KE || Robert L. Staehle, astronautical engineer at JPL || 
|-id=876
| 3876 Quaide || 1988 KJ || William L. Quaide, expert in Solar System exploration at NASA || 
|-id=877
| 3877 Braes || 3108 P-L || Lucien Lucas Eduard Braes (born 1936), Belgian astronomer at Leiden Observatory || 
|-id=878
| 3878 Jyoumon ||  || Jōmon period, prehistoric Japan || 
|-id=879
| 3879 Machar || 1983 QA || Josef Svatopluk Machar (1864–1942), Czech writer and poet || 
|-id=880
| 3880 Kaiserman || 1984 WK || Michael Kaiserman, American aeronautical engineer || 
|-id=881
| 3881 Doumergua || 1925 VF || Gaston Doumergue (1863–1937), thirteenth president of France during 1924–1931, and his wife || 
|-id=882
| 3882 Johncox || 1962 RN || John P. Cox (1926–1984), American astronomer, researcher into variable stars || 
|-id=883
| 3883 Verbano || 1972 RQ || Lake Maggiore or Lago Verbàno, located in Italy and Switzerland on the south side of the Alps || 
|-id=884
| 3884 Alferov ||  || Zhores Alferov (born 1930), Russian physicist || 
|-id=885
| 3885 Bogorodskij ||  || Aleksandr Fyodorovich Bogorodskij (1907–1984), Soviet astrophysicist || 
|-id=886
| 3886 Shcherbakovia ||  || Sergej Vasil'evich Shcherbakov (1856–1931), founder of the Nizhegorodskij circle of amateur physicists and astronomers || 
|-id=887
| 3887 Gerstner || 1985 QX || František Josef Gerstner (1756–1832) and his son František Antonín Gerstner (1795–1840), Czech physicist and railway engineers || 
|-id=888
| 3888 Hoyt || 1984 FO || William Graves Hoyt (1921–1985), American journalist and historian || 
|-id=889
| 3889 Menshikov ||  || Alexander Danilovich Menshikov (1673–1729), Russian statesman and military leader || 
|-id=890
| 3890 Bunin ||  || Ivan Bunin (1870–1953) first Russian writer to win the Nobel Prize for Literature || 
|-id=891
| 3891 Werner ||  || Robert A. Werner, aerospace engineer at the University of Texas at Austin || 
|-id=892
| 3892 Dezsö || 1941 HD || Lóránt Dezső, Hungarian astronomer, founder and director of the Observatory for Solar Physics in Debrecen, Hungary || 
|-id=893
| 3893 DeLaeter ||  || John DeLaeter, retired professor at Curtin University, Western Australia || 
|-id=894
| 3894 Williamcooke ||  || William Ernest Cooke (1863–1947), an Australian astronomer || 
|-id=895
| 3895 Earhart || 1987 DE || Amelia Earhart (1897–1937; disappeared), an American aviation pioneer || 
|-id=896
| 3896 Pordenone || 1987 WB || Il Pordenone, one of the Italian 16th century masters of painting || 
|-id=897
| 3897 Louhi || 1942 RT || Louhi, the wicked queen of the land known as Pohjola in Finnish || 
|-id=898
| 3898 Curlewis ||  || Harold Curlewis (1875–1968), Australian government astronomer and director of the Perth Observatory || 
|-id=899
| 3899 Wichterle ||  || Otto Wichterle (1913–1998), Czech chemist and inventor of the contact lens || 
|-id=900
| 3900 Knežević || 1985 RK || Zoran Knežević (born 1949), an astronomer at the Astronomical Observatory of Belgrade || 
|}

3901–4000 

|-
| 3901 Nanjingdaxue || 1958 GQ || Nanjing University || 
|-id=902
| 3902 Yoritomo || 1986 AL || Minamoto no Yoritomo (1147–1199), founder of the Kamakura shogunate, Japan || 
|-id=903
| 3903 Kliment Ohridski ||  || Kliment Ohridski (840–916), one of the first Bulgarian philosophers || 
|-id=904
| 3904 Honda || 1988 DQ || Minoru Honda (1913–1990), Japanese astronomer || 
|-id=905
| 3905 Doppler || 1984 QO || Christian Doppler (1803–1853), Austrian mathematician and physicist || 
|-id=906
| 3906 Chao ||  || Edward C. T. Chao (1919–2008), American geologist || 
|-id=907
| 3907 Kilmartin || A904 PC || Pamela M. Kilmartin, New Zealand astronomer and discoverer of minor planets || 
|-id=908
| 3908 Nyx || 1980 PA || Nyx, Greek goddess || 
|-id=909
| 3909 Gladys ||  || Gladys Marie Zeigler (1921–1988), mother of discoverer Kenneth W. Zeigler || 
|-id=910
| 3910 Liszt || 1988 SF || Franz Liszt (1811–1886), Hungarian pianist and composer || 
|-id=911
| 3911 Otomo || 1940 QB || Satoru Otomo (born 1957), Japanese amateur astronomer and discoverer of minor planets || 
|-id=912
| 3912 Troja || 1988 SG || Troy, ancient legendary city || 
|-id=913
| 3913 Chemin ||  || Henriette and Robert Chemin, librarian, engineer at Paris Observatory, and discoverer of minor planets || 
|-id=914
| 3914 Kotogahama || 1987 SE || Kotogahama, beach in Geisei near Geisei Observatory, Japan || 
|-id=915
| 3915 Fukushima ||  || Hisao Fukushima (1911–), amateur astronomer and professor at Hokkaido University, Japan || 
|-id=916
| 3916 Maeva ||  || Maeva d'Alloy d'Hocquincourt Vitry (1985–1982), niece of ESO astronomer Patrice Bouchet Vitry || 
|-id=917
| 3917 Franz Schubert || 1961 CX || Franz Schubert (1797–1828), composer || 
|-id=918
| 3918 Brel ||  || Jacques Brel (1929–1978), Belgian songwriter and performer || 
|-id=919
| 3919 Maryanning || 1984 DS || Mary Anning (1799–1847), English fossil hunter || 
|-id=920
| 3920 Aubignan || 1948 WF || Aubignan, village in southeastern France || 
|-id=921
| 3921 Klementʹev || 1971 OH || Zahar Ivanovich Klementyev (1903–1994), Russian mathematician || 
|-id=922
| 3922 Heather ||  || Heather Couper (1949–2020), British astronomer, writer and broadcaster || 
|-id=923
| 3923 Radzievskij ||  || Vladimir Vyacheslavovich Radzievskii, Russian astronomer || 
|-id=924
| 3924 Birch || 1977 CU || Peter V. Birch, astronomer at Perth Observatory || 
|-id=925
| 3925 Tretʹyakov ||  || Pavel Tretyakov (1832–1898) and his brother Sergei Mikhailovich Tretyakov (1834–1892), Russian art collectors || 
|-id=926
| 3926 Ramirez ||  || Abel R. Ramirez, manager and host of the Athenaeum at Caltech || 
|-id=927
| 3927 Feliciaplatt ||  || Felicia Platt, mother of John Platt, a computer scientist and discoverer of minor planets || 
|-id=928
| 3928 Randa || 1981 PG || Randa small village near Zermatt in the Swiss Alps || 
|-id=929
| 3929 Carmelmaria ||  || Carmel Maria Borg, secretary at the Perth Observatory and administrative assistant || 
|-id=930
| 3930 Vasilev ||  || Konstantin Vasilyev (1942–1976), Russian painter || 
|-id=931
| 3931 Batten || 1984 EN || Alan H. Batten, Canadian astronomer at the Dominion Astrophysical Observatory in Victoria, British Columbia || 
|-id=932
| 3932 Edshay ||  || Edwin L. Shay (1938–1998), educator in Worthington, Ohio, and Syracuse, New York || 
|-id=933
| 3933 Portugal ||  || Portugal || 
|-id=934
| 3934 Tove ||  || Tove Augustesen, wife of Danish discoverer Karl Augustesen || 
|-id=935
| 3935 Toatenmongakkai || 1987 PB || The Oriental Astronomical Association (Toatenmongakkai) was founded by Issei Yamamoto in 1920 || 
|-id=936
| 3936 Elst || 2321 T-3 || Eric Walter Elst (born 1936), Belgian astronomer and discoverer of minor planets || 
|-id=937
| 3937 Bretagnon || 1932 EO || Pierre Bretagnon, astronomer at the Bureau des Longitudes in France || 
|-id=938
| 3938 Chapront || 1949 PL || Jean Chapront and Michelle Chapront-Touzé, astronomers at the Bureau des Longitudes in France || 
|-id=939
| 3939 Huruhata || 1953 GO || Masaaki Huruhata (1912–1988), astronomer at Tokyo Astronomical Observatory, Japan || 
|-id=940
| 3940 Larion ||  || Larisa Ivanovna Golubkina, Russian actress || 
|-id=941
| 3941 Haydn ||  || Joseph Haydn (1732–1809), Austrian composer || 
|-id=942
| 3942 Churivannia ||  || Ivan Ivanovich Churyumov (1907–1942) Soviet soldier, and Ivan Ivanovich Churyumov (1929–1988), Soviet philosopher and poet || 
|-id=943
| 3943 Silbermann ||  || Gottfried Silbermann (1683–1753), a German builder of keyboard instruments || 
|-id=944
| 3944 Halliday ||  || Ian Halliday, Canadian astronomer || 
|-id=945
| 3945 Gerasimenko || 1982 PL || Svetlana Gerasimenko (born 1945) Soviet comets researcher || 
|-id=946
| 3946 Shor ||  || Viktor Abramovich Shor, Soviet minor planet researcher || 
|-id=947
| 3947 Swedenborg || 1983 XD || Emanuel Swedenborg (1688–1772), Swedish scientist, philosopher, poet and theologian || 
|-id=948
| 3948 Bohr || 1985 RF || Niels Henrik David Bohr (1885–1962), Danish physicist || 
|-id=949
| 3949 Mach || 1985 UL || Ernst Mach (1838–1916), Austrian-Czech physicist and philosopher || 
|-id=950
| 3950 Yoshida || 1986 CH || Tougo Yoshida (1864–1918), Japanese toponymist || 
|-id=951
| 3951 Zichichi ||  || Antonino Zichichi (born 1929), Italian astrophysicist and protagonist of CERN || 
|-id=952
| 3952 Russellmark ||  || Russell Mark Group has assisted Minor Planet Center with editing asteroid citations || 
|-id=953
| 3953 Perth ||  || Perth Observatory in Australia || 
|-id=954
| 3954 Mendelssohn || 1987 HU || Felix Mendelssohn (1809–1847), German composer || 
|-id=955
| 3955 Bruckner ||  || Anton Bruckner (1824–1896), Austrian composer || 
|-id=956
| 3956 Caspar ||  || Caspar Karstensen, grandson of the discoverer Poul Jensen || 
|-id=957
| 3957 Sugie || 1933 OD || Atsushi Sugie, Japanese astronomer || 
|-id=958
| 3958 Komendantov || 1953 TC || Nikolaj Vasil'evich Komendantov (1895–1937), Russian astronomer || 
|-id=959
| 3959 Irwin ||  || John B. Irwin, professor of astronomy at Indiana University and protagonist of the Kitt Peak National Observatory site selection || 
|-id=960
| 3960 Chaliubieju || 1955 BG || Cha Liubieju, a friend of the discoverer || 
|-id=961
| 3961 Arthurcox || 1962 OB || Arthur N. Cox, early member of the Indiana Asteroid Program || 
|-id=962
| 3962 Valyaev || 1967 CC || Valerij Ivanovich Valyaev (born 1944), Soviet astronomer at the Institute for Theoretical Astronomy (ITA) || 
|-id=963
| 3963 Paradzhanov ||  || Sergei Paradzhanov (1924–1990), Soviet film producer || 
|-id=964
| 3964 Danilevskij ||  || Grigory Danilevsky (1829–1890), Russian and Ukrainian writer || 
|-id=965
| 3965 Konopleva ||  || Valentina Petrovna Konopleva, astronomer at Main Ukrainian Astronomical Observatory (part of NAN Ukraine) || 
|-id=966
| 3966 Cherednichenko ||  || Vladimir Ivanovich Cherednichenko, cometary researcher at Kiev Polytechnic Institute || 
|-id=967
| 3967 Shekhtelia ||  || Fyodor Osipovich Shekhtel' (1859–1926), Russian architect || 
|-id=968
| 3968 Koptelov ||  || Afanasij Lazarevich Koptelov, Soviet writer || 
|-id=969
| 3969 Rossi ||  || Carlo Rossi (1775–1849), Italian-Russian architect || 
|-id=970
| 3970 Herran ||  || Jose Antonio Ruiz de la Herran Villagomez (born 1925), technical advisor of the Museum Universum in Mexico City || 
|-id=971
| 3971 Voronikhin ||  || Andrej Nikiforovich Voronikhin (1759–1814), Russian architect || 
|-id=972
| 3972 Richard ||  || Richard Arthur Spellmann, brother of discoverer Carolyn Shoemaker, chemist and mayor of El Cerrito, California || 
|-id=973
| 3973 Ogilvie ||  || Robert E. Ogilvie (1923–), professor of metallurgy at MIT and a researcher at the Boston Museum of Fine Arts || 
|-id=974
| 3974 Verveer || 1982 FS || Arie J. B. Verveer, Dutch-born astronomer, Director of Perth Observatory in Western Australia || 
|-id=975
| 3975 Verdi ||  || Giuseppe Verdi, Italian composer || 
|-id=976
| 3976 Lise || 1983 JM || Lise Melinda Breakey Thomas, daughter-in-law of discoverer Norman G. Thomas || 
|-id=977
| 3977 Maxine || 1983 LM || Maxine Shoemaker Heath, American entomologist, sister of Eugene Shoemaker || 
|-id=978
| 3978 Klepešta ||  || Josef Klepešta (1895–1976), Czech astronomer || 
|-id=979
| 3979 Brorsen ||  || Theodor Brorsen (1819–1895), Danish astronomer || 
|-id=980
| 3980 Hviezdoslav || 1983 XU || Pavol Országh Hviezdoslav (1849–1921), Slovak poet || 
|-id=981
| 3981 Stodola || 1984 BL || Aurel Stodola (1859–1942), Slovak engineer, physicist, and inventor || 
|-id=982
| 3982 Kastelʹ ||  || Galina Richardovna Kastel, Soviet comets researcher and discoverer of minor planets || 
|-id=983
| 3983 Sakiko || 1984 SX || Sakiko Nakano, sister of Japanese astronomer Syuichi Nakano || 
|-id=984
| 3984 Chacos ||  || Albert Anthony Chacos (born 1953), an American space engineer, helped further the exploration of the planets as a key engineer for NASA's New Horizons Pluto-Kuiper Belt mission. He also played important roles in other space missions, including the Messenger mission to Mercury || 
|-id=985
| 3985 Raybatson || 1985 CX || Raymond M. Batson, American planetary geologist and cartographer with the United States Geological Survey || 
|-id=986
| 3986 Rozhkovskij ||  || Dmitrij Aleksandrovich Rozhkovskij (1915–1991), Soviet astronomer || 
|-id=987
| 3987 Wujek ||  || Joseph H. Wujek, American scientist || 
|-id=988
| 3988 Huma || 1986 LA || The Huma bird in Iranian mythology and Sufi poetry is a bird of fortune since its touch, or even sight of its shadow, is said to be auspicious. || 
|-id=989
| 3989 Odin || 1986 RM || Odin, Norse god || 
|-id=990
| 3990 Heimdal ||  || Heimdall, Norse god || 
|-id=991
| 3991 Basilevsky ||  || Alexandr T. Basilevsky, Soviet planetary geologist || 
|-id=992
| 3992 Wagner ||  || Richard Wagner (1813–1883), German composer || 
|-id=993
| 3993 Šorm ||  || František Šorm (1913–1980), a Czech chemist, president of the Czechoslovak Academy of Sciences during the International Geophysical Year, and founder of the Institute for Organic Chemistry and Biochemistry in Prague || 
|-id=994
| 3994 Ayashi || 1988 XF || Ayashi, a district of the city of Sendai, Japan || 
|-id=995
| 3995 Sakaino || 1988 XM || Teruo Sakaino (born 1917), glass and ceramics chemist || 
|-id=996
| 3996 Fugaku ||  || One of ancient names for Mount Fuji in Japan || 
|-id=997
| 3997 Taga ||  || Taga, Shiga, Japan || 
|-id=998
| 3998 Tezuka || 1989 AB || Osamu Tezuka (1928–1989), Japanese manga artist || 
|-id=999
| 3999 Aristarchus || 1989 AL || Aristarchus of Samos, Ancient Greek astronomer and mathematician || 
|-id=000
| 4000 Hipparchus || 1989 AV || Hipparchus, Ancient Greek scientist || 
|}

References 

003001-004000